

7001–7100 

|-bgcolor=#fefefe
| 7001 Noether || 1955 EH ||  || March 14, 1955 || Brooklyn || Indiana University || — || align=right | 6.1 km || 
|-id=002 bgcolor=#FA8072
| 7002 Bronshten || 1971 OV ||  || July 26, 1971 || Nauchnij || N. S. Chernykh || moon || align=right | 3.2 km || 
|-id=003 bgcolor=#d6d6d6
| 7003 Zoyamironova ||  ||  || September 25, 1976 || Nauchnij || N. S. Chernykh || — || align=right | 17 km || 
|-id=004 bgcolor=#fefefe
| 7004 Markthiemens ||  ||  || July 24, 1979 || Siding Spring || S. J. Bus || FLO || align=right | 4.4 km || 
|-id=005 bgcolor=#fefefe
| 7005 Henninghaack ||  ||  || March 2, 1981 || Siding Spring || S. J. Bus || V || align=right | 3.2 km || 
|-id=006 bgcolor=#fefefe
| 7006 Folco ||  ||  || March 2, 1981 || Siding Spring || S. J. Bus || — || align=right | 2.2 km || 
|-id=007 bgcolor=#fefefe
| 7007 Timjull ||  ||  || March 2, 1981 || Siding Spring || S. J. Bus || MAS || align=right | 2.7 km || 
|-id=008 bgcolor=#E9E9E9
| 7008 Pavlov ||  ||  || August 23, 1985 || Nauchnij || N. S. Chernykh || — || align=right | 7.3 km || 
|-id=009 bgcolor=#fefefe
| 7009 Hume ||  ||  || August 21, 1987 || La Silla || E. W. Elst || — || align=right | 2.9 km || 
|-id=010 bgcolor=#fefefe
| 7010 Locke ||  ||  || August 28, 1987 || La Silla || E. W. Elst || — || align=right | 4.2 km || 
|-id=011 bgcolor=#fefefe
| 7011 Worley ||  ||  || September 21, 1987 || Anderson Mesa || E. Bowell || FLO || align=right | 5.2 km || 
|-id=012 bgcolor=#fefefe
| 7012 Hobbes ||  ||  || February 11, 1988 || La Silla || E. W. Elst || V || align=right | 4.7 km || 
|-id=013 bgcolor=#E9E9E9
| 7013 Trachet ||  ||  || September 1, 1988 || La Silla || H. Debehogne || — || align=right | 5.4 km || 
|-id=014 bgcolor=#fefefe
| 7014 Nietzsche ||  ||  || April 3, 1989 || La Silla || E. W. Elst || NYS || align=right | 5.0 km || 
|-id=015 bgcolor=#fefefe
| 7015 Schopenhauer ||  ||  || August 16, 1990 || La Silla || E. W. Elst || ERI || align=right | 4.8 km || 
|-id=016 bgcolor=#fefefe
| 7016 Conandoyle || 1991 YG ||  || December 30, 1991 || Oohira || T. Urata || — || align=right | 4.1 km || 
|-id=017 bgcolor=#fefefe
| 7017 Uradowan ||  ||  || February 1, 1992 || Geisei || T. Seki || — || align=right | 4.6 km || 
|-id=018 bgcolor=#fefefe
| 7018 || 1992 DF || — || February 25, 1992 || Kushiro || S. Ueda, H. Kaneda || — || align=right | 4.4 km || 
|-id=019 bgcolor=#fefefe
| 7019 Tagayuichan ||  ||  || March 8, 1992 || Dynic || A. Sugie || — || align=right | 13 km || 
|-id=020 bgcolor=#fefefe
| 7020 Yourcenar ||  ||  || April 4, 1992 || La Silla || E. W. Elst || NYS || align=right | 9.1 km || 
|-id=021 bgcolor=#E9E9E9
| 7021 Tomiokamachi ||  ||  || May 6, 1992 || Dynic || A. Sugie || — || align=right | 8.9 km || 
|-id=022 bgcolor=#E9E9E9
| 7022 ||  || — || May 2, 1992 || Kushiro || S. Ueda, H. Kaneda || MAR || align=right | 7.0 km || 
|-id=023 bgcolor=#fefefe
| 7023 Heiankyo || 1992 KE ||  || May 25, 1992 || Dynic || A. Sugie || — || align=right | 5.8 km || 
|-id=024 bgcolor=#d6d6d6
| 7024 ||  || — || August 2, 1992 || Palomar || H. E. Holt || THM || align=right | 17 km || 
|-id=025 bgcolor=#FFC2E0
| 7025 || 1993 QA || — || August 16, 1993 || Kitt Peak || Spacewatch || APO +1km || align=right data-sort-value="0.5" | 500 m || 
|-id=026 bgcolor=#fefefe
| 7026 Gabrielasilang ||  ||  || August 19, 1993 || Palomar || E. F. Helin || NYS || align=right | 2.9 km || 
|-id=027 bgcolor=#d6d6d6
| 7027 Toshihanda || 1993 XT ||  || December 11, 1993 || Oizumi || T. Kobayashi || 3:2 || align=right | 24 km || 
|-id=028 bgcolor=#d6d6d6
| 7028 Tachikawa ||  ||  || December 5, 1993 || Nyukasa || M. Hirasawa, S. Suzuki || KOR || align=right | 7.3 km || 
|-id=029 bgcolor=#d6d6d6
| 7029 ||  || — || December 14, 1993 || Palomar || PCAS || — || align=right | 18 km || 
|-id=030 bgcolor=#fefefe
| 7030 Colombini || 1993 YU ||  || December 18, 1993 || Stroncone || Santa Lucia Obs. || CHL || align=right | 6.5 km || 
|-id=031 bgcolor=#fefefe
| 7031 Kazumiyoshioka || 1994 UU ||  || October 31, 1994 || Nachi-Katsuura || Y. Shimizu, T. Urata || FLO || align=right | 3.3 km || 
|-id=032 bgcolor=#fefefe
| 7032 Hitchcock ||  ||  || November 3, 1994 || Nachi-Katsuura || Y. Shimizu, T. Urata || FLO || align=right | 4.8 km || 
|-id=033 bgcolor=#fefefe
| 7033 ||  || — || November 28, 1994 || Kushiro || S. Ueda, H. Kaneda || — || align=right | 4.7 km || 
|-id=034 bgcolor=#fefefe
| 7034 ||  || — || December 25, 1994 || Kushiro || S. Ueda, H. Kaneda || V || align=right | 3.2 km || 
|-id=035 bgcolor=#d6d6d6
| 7035 Gomi ||  ||  || January 28, 1995 || Kitami || K. Endate, K. Watanabe || THM || align=right | 15 km || 
|-id=036 bgcolor=#d6d6d6
| 7036 Kentarohirata ||  ||  || January 29, 1995 || Nachi-Katsuura || Y. Shimizu, T. Urata || — || align=right | 19 km || 
|-id=037 bgcolor=#d6d6d6
| 7037 Davidlean ||  ||  || January 29, 1995 || Nachi-Katsuura || Y. Shimizu, T. Urata || — || align=right | 17 km || 
|-id=038 bgcolor=#d6d6d6
| 7038 Tokorozawa ||  ||  || February 22, 1995 || Chichibu || N. Satō, T. Urata || THMslow || align=right | 14 km || 
|-id=039 bgcolor=#fefefe
| 7039 Yamagata ||  ||  || April 14, 1996 || Nanyo || T. Okuni || V || align=right | 4.2 km || 
|-id=040 bgcolor=#fefefe
| 7040 Harwood || 2642 P-L ||  || September 24, 1960 || Palomar || PLS || FLO || align=right | 3.9 km || 
|-id=041 bgcolor=#fefefe
| 7041 Nantucket || 4081 P-L ||  || September 24, 1960 || Palomar || PLS || — || align=right | 3.9 km || 
|-id=042 bgcolor=#fefefe
| 7042 Carver ||  ||  || March 24, 1933 || Heidelberg || K. Reinmuth || — || align=right | 4.5 km || 
|-id=043 bgcolor=#fefefe
| 7043 Godart || 1934 RB ||  || September 2, 1934 || Uccle || E. Delporte || FLO || align=right | 5.7 km || 
|-id=044 bgcolor=#fefefe
| 7044 || 1971 UK || — || October 26, 1971 || Hamburg-Bergedorf || L. Kohoutek || — || align=right | 3.6 km || 
|-id=045 bgcolor=#fefefe
| 7045 || 1974 FJ || — || March 22, 1974 || Cerro El Roble || C. Torres || — || align=right | 2.6 km || 
|-id=046 bgcolor=#d6d6d6
| 7046 Reshetnev ||  ||  || August 20, 1977 || Nauchnij || N. S. Chernykh || EOS || align=right | 12 km || 
|-id=047 bgcolor=#fefefe
| 7047 Lundström ||  ||  || September 2, 1978 || La Silla || C.-I. Lagerkvist || PHO || align=right | 4.3 km || 
|-id=048 bgcolor=#d6d6d6
| 7048 Chaussidon ||  ||  || March 2, 1981 || Siding Spring || S. J. Bus || — || align=right | 4.9 km || 
|-id=049 bgcolor=#fefefe
| 7049 Meibom ||  ||  || October 24, 1981 || Palomar || S. J. Bus || — || align=right | 3.9 km || 
|-id=050 bgcolor=#E9E9E9
| 7050 ||  || — || March 20, 1982 || La Silla || H. Debehogne || DOR || align=right | 16 km || 
|-id=051 bgcolor=#d6d6d6
| 7051 Sean || 1985 JY ||  || May 13, 1985 || Palomar || C. S. Shoemaker, E. M. Shoemaker || — || align=right | 15 km || 
|-id=052 bgcolor=#E9E9E9
| 7052 Octaviabutler ||  ||  || November 12, 1988 || Palomar || E. F. Helin || — || align=right | 9.1 km || 
|-id=053 bgcolor=#fefefe
| 7053 || 1989 FA || — || March 28, 1989 || Dynic || A. Sugie || FLO || align=right | 4.5 km || 
|-id=054 bgcolor=#fefefe
| 7054 Brehm ||  ||  || April 6, 1989 || Tautenburg Observatory || F. Börngen || FLO || align=right | 3.7 km || 
|-id=055 bgcolor=#fefefe
| 7055 Fabiopagan || 1989 KB ||  || May 31, 1989 || Palomar || H. E. Holt || PHO || align=right | 6.7 km || 
|-id=056 bgcolor=#E9E9E9
| 7056 Kierkegaard ||  ||  || September 26, 1989 || La Silla || E. W. Elst || AGN || align=right | 7.6 km || 
|-id=057 bgcolor=#fefefe
| 7057 Al-Fārābī ||  ||  || August 22, 1990 || Palomar || H. E. Holt || — || align=right | 4.3 km || 
|-id=058 bgcolor=#fefefe
| 7058 Al-Ṭūsī ||  ||  || September 16, 1990 || Palomar || H. E. Holt || FLO || align=right | 5.6 km || 
|-id=059 bgcolor=#fefefe
| 7059 Van Dokkum ||  ||  || September 18, 1990 || Palomar || H. E. Holt || — || align=right | 4.1 km || 
|-id=060 bgcolor=#fefefe
| 7060 Al-ʻIjliya ||  ||  || September 16, 1990 || Palomar || H. E. Holt || — || align=right | 5.1 km || 
|-id=061 bgcolor=#d6d6d6
| 7061 Pieri ||  ||  || August 15, 1991 || Palomar || E. F. Helin || — || align=right | 16 km || 
|-id=062 bgcolor=#d6d6d6
| 7062 Meslier ||  ||  || August 6, 1991 || La Silla || E. W. Elst || TIR || align=right | 6.6 km || 
|-id=063 bgcolor=#fefefe
| 7063 Johnmichell || 1991 UK ||  || October 18, 1991 || Kushiro || S. Ueda, H. Kaneda || — || align=right | 3.8 km || 
|-id=064 bgcolor=#d6d6d6
| 7064 Montesquieu ||  ||  || July 26, 1992 || La Silla || E. W. Elst || THM || align=right | 14 km || 
|-id=065 bgcolor=#E9E9E9
| 7065 Fredschaaf ||  ||  || August 2, 1992 || Palomar || H. E. Holt || — || align=right | 16 km || 
|-id=066 bgcolor=#C7FF8F
| 7066 Nessus ||  ||  || April 26, 1993 || Kitt Peak || Spacewatch || centaurcritical || align=right | 53 km || 
|-id=067 bgcolor=#d6d6d6
| 7067 Kiyose || 1993 XE ||  || December 4, 1993 || Nyukasa || M. Hirasawa, S. Suzuki || EOS || align=right | 14 km || 
|-id=068 bgcolor=#fefefe
| 7068 Minowa ||  ||  || November 26, 1994 || Yatsugatake || Y. Kushida, O. Muramatsu || — || align=right | 5.8 km || 
|-id=069 bgcolor=#fefefe
| 7069 ||  || — || December 30, 1994 || Kushiro || S. Ueda, H. Kaneda || — || align=right | 10 km || 
|-id=070 bgcolor=#fefefe
| 7070 ||  || — || December 25, 1994 || Kushiro || S. Ueda, H. Kaneda || — || align=right | 4.3 km || 
|-id=071 bgcolor=#d6d6d6
| 7071 ||  || — || January 28, 1995 || Kushiro || S. Ueda, H. Kaneda || — || align=right | 15 km || 
|-id=072 bgcolor=#fefefe
| 7072 Beijingdaxue ||  ||  || February 3, 1996 || Xinglong || SCAP || — || align=right | 4.2 km || 
|-id=073 bgcolor=#fefefe
| 7073 Rudbelia ||  ||  || September 11, 1972 || Nauchnij || N. S. Chernykh || FLO || align=right | 2.9 km || 
|-id=074 bgcolor=#fefefe
| 7074 Muckea ||  ||  || September 10, 1977 || Nauchnij || N. S. Chernykh || — || align=right | 3.1 km || 
|-id=075 bgcolor=#E9E9E9
| 7075 Sadovnichij ||  ||  || September 24, 1979 || Nauchnij || N. S. Chernykh || EUN || align=right | 7.7 km || 
|-id=076 bgcolor=#d6d6d6
| 7076 || 1980 UC || — || October 30, 1980 || Kleť || Z. Vávrová || — || align=right | 13 km || 
|-id=077 bgcolor=#d6d6d6
| 7077 Shermanschultz || 1982 VZ ||  || November 15, 1982 || Anderson Mesa || E. Bowell || THM || align=right | 14 km || 
|-id=078 bgcolor=#fefefe
| 7078 Unojönsson ||  ||  || October 17, 1985 || Kvistaberg || C.-I. Lagerkvist || NYS || align=right | 9.0 km || 
|-id=079 bgcolor=#FA8072
| 7079 Baghdad || 1986 RR ||  || September 5, 1986 || Smolyan || E. W. Elst, V. G. Ivanova || — || align=right | 3.0 km || 
|-id=080 bgcolor=#fefefe
| 7080 ||  || — || September 5, 1986 || Kleť || A. Mrkos || FLO || align=right | 4.3 km || 
|-id=081 bgcolor=#E9E9E9
| 7081 Ludibunda ||  ||  || August 30, 1987 || Zimmerwald || P. Wild || — || align=right | 10 km || 
|-id=082 bgcolor=#d6d6d6
| 7082 La Serena ||  ||  || December 17, 1987 || La Silla || E. W. Elst, G. Pizarro || — || align=right | 9.5 km || 
|-id=083 bgcolor=#E9E9E9
| 7083 Kant ||  ||  || February 4, 1989 || La Silla || E. W. Elst || — || align=right | 13 km || 
|-id=084 bgcolor=#E9E9E9
| 7084 || 1991 BR || — || January 19, 1991 || Dynic || A. Sugie || — || align=right | 5.6 km || 
|-id=085 bgcolor=#d6d6d6
| 7085 || 1991 PE || — || August 5, 1991 || Palomar || H. E. Holt || — || align=right | 17 km || 
|-id=086 bgcolor=#fefefe
| 7086 Bopp ||  ||  || October 5, 1991 || Palomar || C. S. Shoemaker, E. M. Shoemaker || H || align=right | 4.0 km || 
|-id=087 bgcolor=#fefefe
| 7087 Lewotsky ||  ||  || October 13, 1991 || Palomar || E. F. Helin || H || align=right | 2.6 km || 
|-id=088 bgcolor=#FFC2E0
| 7088 Ishtar || 1992 AA ||  || January 1, 1992 || Palomar || C. S. Shoemaker, E. M. Shoemaker || AMO +1kmmoon || align=right | 1.3 km || 
|-id=089 bgcolor=#fefefe
| 7089 ||  || — || March 23, 1992 || Kushiro || S. Ueda, H. Kaneda || — || align=right | 5.0 km || 
|-id=090 bgcolor=#fefefe
| 7090 ||  || — || April 23, 1992 || La Silla || H. Debehogne || FLO || align=right | 4.7 km || 
|-id=091 bgcolor=#fefefe
| 7091 Maryfields || 1992 JA ||  || May 1, 1992 || Palomar || K. J. Lawrence, E. F. Helin || PHO || align=right | 5.2 km || 
|-id=092 bgcolor=#FFC2E0
| 7092 Cadmus || 1992 LC ||  || June 4, 1992 || Palomar || C. S. Shoemaker, E. M. Shoemaker || APO +1km || align=right | 6.3 km || 
|-id=093 bgcolor=#fefefe
| 7093 Jonleake || 1992 OT ||  || July 26, 1992 || Palomar || E. F. Helin || — || align=right | 4.3 km || 
|-id=094 bgcolor=#E9E9E9
| 7094 Godaisan || 1992 RJ ||  || September 4, 1992 || Geisei || T. Seki || GEF || align=right | 8.1 km || 
|-id=095 bgcolor=#d6d6d6
| 7095 Lamettrie ||  ||  || September 22, 1992 || La Silla || E. W. Elst || — || align=right | 8.3 km || 
|-id=096 bgcolor=#FA8072
| 7096 Napier || 1992 VM ||  || November 3, 1992 || Siding Spring || R. H. McNaught || unusual || align=right | 5.6 km || 
|-id=097 bgcolor=#fefefe
| 7097 Yatsuka || 1993 TF ||  || October 8, 1993 || Yatsuka || H. Abe, S. Miyasaka || — || align=right | 4.7 km || 
|-id=098 bgcolor=#E9E9E9
| 7098 Réaumur ||  ||  || October 9, 1993 || La Silla || E. W. Elst || — || align=right | 9.6 km || 
|-id=099 bgcolor=#d6d6d6
| 7099 Feuerbach ||  ||  || April 20, 1996 || La Silla || E. W. Elst || THM || align=right | 13 km || 
|-id=100 bgcolor=#d6d6d6
| 7100 Martin Luther || 1360 T-2 ||  || September 29, 1973 || Palomar || PLS || KOR || align=right | 3.8 km || 
|}

7101–7200 

|-bgcolor=#fefefe
| 7101 Haritina || 1930 UX ||  || October 17, 1930 || Flagstaff || C. W. Tombaugh || — || align=right | 3.0 km || 
|-id=102 bgcolor=#d6d6d6
| 7102 Neilbone || 1936 NB ||  || July 12, 1936 || Johannesburg || C. Jackson || — || align=right | 21 km || 
|-id=103 bgcolor=#d6d6d6
| 7103 Wichmann || 1953 GH ||  || April 7, 1953 || Heidelberg || K. Reinmuth || EOS || align=right | 8.8 km || 
|-id=104 bgcolor=#fefefe
| 7104 Manyousyu || 1977 DU ||  || February 18, 1977 || Kiso || H. Kosai, K. Furukawa || V || align=right | 6.2 km || 
|-id=105 bgcolor=#fefefe
| 7105 Yousyozan ||  ||  || February 18, 1977 || Kiso || H. Kosai, K. Furukawa || NYS || align=right | 3.0 km || 
|-id=106 bgcolor=#E9E9E9
| 7106 Kondakov ||  ||  || August 8, 1978 || Nauchnij || N. S. Chernykh || — || align=right | 7.6 km || 
|-id=107 bgcolor=#fefefe
| 7107 Peiser ||  ||  || August 15, 1980 || Kleť || A. Mrkos || — || align=right | 4.8 km || 
|-id=108 bgcolor=#d6d6d6
| 7108 Nefedov ||  ||  || September 2, 1981 || Nauchnij || N. S. Chernykh || — || align=right | 10 km || 
|-id=109 bgcolor=#E9E9E9
| 7109 Heine ||  ||  || September 1, 1983 || Nauchnij || L. G. Karachkina || — || align=right | 11 km || 
|-id=110 bgcolor=#E9E9E9
| 7110 Johnpearse ||  ||  || December 7, 1983 || Bickley || Perth Obs. || DOR || align=right | 14 km || 
|-id=111 bgcolor=#fefefe
| 7111 ||  || — || August 17, 1985 || Palomar || E. F. Helin || — || align=right | 6.1 km || 
|-id=112 bgcolor=#E9E9E9
| 7112 Ghislaine || 1986 GV ||  || April 3, 1986 || Palomar || C. S. Shoemaker, E. M. Shoemaker || — || align=right | 11 km || 
|-id=113 bgcolor=#d6d6d6
| 7113 Ostapbender ||  ||  || September 29, 1986 || Nauchnij || L. G. Karachkina || — || align=right | 18 km || 
|-id=114 bgcolor=#d6d6d6
| 7114 Weinek ||  ||  || November 29, 1986 || Kleť || A. Mrkos || HYG || align=right | 14 km || 
|-id=115 bgcolor=#d6d6d6
| 7115 Franciscuszeno ||  ||  || November 29, 1986 || Kleť || A. Mrkos || HYG || align=right | 8.8 km || 
|-id=116 bgcolor=#fefefe
| 7116 Mentall || 1986 XX ||  || December 2, 1986 || Anderson Mesa || E. Bowell || — || align=right | 7.4 km || 
|-id=117 bgcolor=#fefefe
| 7117 Claudius ||  ||  || February 14, 1988 || Tautenburg Observatory || F. Börngen || — || align=right | 3.2 km || 
|-id=118 bgcolor=#E9E9E9
| 7118 Kuklov ||  ||  || November 4, 1988 || Kleť || A. Mrkos || EUN || align=right | 10 km || 
|-id=119 bgcolor=#C2FFFF
| 7119 Hiera ||  ||  || January 11, 1989 || Palomar || C. S. Shoemaker, E. M. Shoemaker || L4slow? || align=right | 59 km || 
|-id=120 bgcolor=#d6d6d6
| 7120 Davidgavine ||  ||  || January 4, 1989 || Siding Spring || R. H. McNaught || KOR || align=right | 7.7 km || 
|-id=121 bgcolor=#d6d6d6
| 7121 Busch ||  ||  || January 10, 1989 || Tautenburg Observatory || F. Börngen || KOR || align=right | 5.2 km || 
|-id=122 bgcolor=#fefefe
| 7122 Iwasaki ||  ||  || March 12, 1989 || Kitami || K. Endate, K. Watanabe || — || align=right | 3.1 km || 
|-id=123 bgcolor=#fefefe
| 7123 ||  || — || October 9, 1989 || Okutama || T. Hioki, N. Kawasato || V || align=right | 5.4 km || 
|-id=124 bgcolor=#d6d6d6
| 7124 Glinos ||  ||  || July 24, 1990 || Palomar || H. E. Holt || — || align=right | 15 km || 
|-id=125 bgcolor=#fefefe
| 7125 Eitarodate ||  ||  || February 7, 1991 || Geisei || T. Seki || NYS || align=right | 8.7 km || 
|-id=126 bgcolor=#d6d6d6
| 7126 Cureau ||  ||  || April 8, 1991 || La Silla || E. W. Elst || KOR || align=right | 5.7 km || 
|-id=127 bgcolor=#d6d6d6
| 7127 Stifter ||  ||  || September 9, 1991 || Tautenburg Observatory || F. Börngen, L. D. Schmadel || — || align=right | 13 km || 
|-id=128 bgcolor=#d6d6d6
| 7128 Misawa ||  ||  || September 30, 1991 || Kitami || K. Endate, K. Watanabe || — || align=right | 14 km || 
|-id=129 bgcolor=#E9E9E9
| 7129 ||  || — || November 4, 1991 || Kushiro || S. Ueda, H. Kaneda || — || align=right | 6.2 km || 
|-id=130 bgcolor=#fefefe
| 7130 Klepper ||  ||  || April 30, 1992 || Tautenburg Observatory || F. Börngen || FLO || align=right | 3.9 km || 
|-id=131 bgcolor=#d6d6d6
| 7131 Longtom || 1992 YL ||  || December 23, 1992 || Yakiimo || A. Natori, T. Urata || — || align=right | 30 km || 
|-id=132 bgcolor=#fefefe
| 7132 Casulli || 1993 SE ||  || September 17, 1993 || Stroncone || Santa Lucia Obs. || moon || align=right | 9.0 km || 
|-id=133 bgcolor=#fefefe
| 7133 Kasahara ||  ||  || October 15, 1993 || Kitami || K. Endate, K. Watanabe || — || align=right | 5.8 km || 
|-id=134 bgcolor=#fefefe
| 7134 Ikeuchisatoru || 1993 UY ||  || October 24, 1993 || Oizumi || T. Kobayashi || — || align=right | 6.4 km || 
|-id=135 bgcolor=#fefefe
| 7135 || 1993 VO || — || November 5, 1993 || Nachi-Katsuura || Y. Shimizu, T. Urata || — || align=right | 4.0 km || 
|-id=136 bgcolor=#E9E9E9
| 7136 Yokohasuo ||  ||  || November 14, 1993 || Fujieda || H. Shiozawa, T. Urata || MAR || align=right | 6.5 km || 
|-id=137 bgcolor=#E9E9E9
| 7137 Ageo ||  ||  || January 4, 1994 || Kiyosato || S. Otomo || AGN || align=right | 7.1 km || 
|-id=138 bgcolor=#E9E9E9
| 7138 ||  || — || January 15, 1994 || Kushiro || S. Ueda, H. Kaneda || slow || align=right | 4.3 km || 
|-id=139 bgcolor=#d6d6d6
| 7139 Tsubokawa ||  ||  || February 14, 1994 || Ojima || T. Niijima, T. Urata || EOS || align=right | 8.8 km || 
|-id=140 bgcolor=#fefefe
| 7140 Osaki ||  ||  || March 4, 1994 || Oizumi || T. Kobayashi || — || align=right | 4.6 km || 
|-id=141 bgcolor=#E9E9E9
| 7141 Bettarini ||  ||  || March 12, 1994 || Cima Ekar || A. Boattini, M. Tombelli || GEF || align=right | 6.8 km || 
|-id=142 bgcolor=#d6d6d6
| 7142 Spinoza ||  ||  || August 12, 1994 || La Silla || E. W. Elst || THM || align=right | 20 km || 
|-id=143 bgcolor=#d6d6d6
| 7143 Haramura ||  ||  || November 17, 1995 || Kiyosato || S. Otomo || — || align=right | 12 km || 
|-id=144 bgcolor=#fefefe
| 7144 Dossobuono || 1996 KQ ||  || May 20, 1996 || Dossobuono || L. Lai || V || align=right | 4.9 km || 
|-id=145 bgcolor=#E9E9E9
| 7145 Linzexu || 1996 LO ||  || June 7, 1996 || Xinglong || SCAP || — || align=right | 7.3 km || 
|-id=146 bgcolor=#d6d6d6
| 7146 Konradin || 3034 P-L ||  || September 24, 1960 || Palomar || PLS || EOS || align=right | 7.6 km || 
|-id=147 bgcolor=#fefefe
| 7147 Feijth || 4015 P-L ||  || September 24, 1960 || Palomar || PLS || NYS || align=right | 2.6 km || 
|-id=148 bgcolor=#fefefe
| 7148 Reinholdbien || 1047 T-1 ||  || March 25, 1971 || Palomar || PLS || — || align=right | 6.1 km || 
|-id=149 bgcolor=#d6d6d6
| 7149 Bernie || 3220 T-3 ||  || October 16, 1977 || Palomar || PLS || THM || align=right | 9.6 km || 
|-id=150 bgcolor=#fefefe
| 7150 McKellar ||  ||  || October 11, 1929 || Flagstaff || C. W. Tombaugh || NYS || align=right | 8.4 km || 
|-id=151 bgcolor=#E9E9E9
| 7151 ||  || — || September 26, 1971 || Cerro El Roble || C. Torres || EUN || align=right | 9.4 km || 
|-id=152 bgcolor=#C2FFFF
| 7152 Euneus ||  ||  || September 19, 1973 || Palomar || PLS || L4 || align=right | 40 km || 
|-id=153 bgcolor=#fefefe
| 7153 Vladzakharov ||  ||  || December 2, 1975 || Nauchnij || T. M. Smirnova || slow || align=right | 7.5 km || 
|-id=154 bgcolor=#fefefe
| 7154 Zhangmaolin ||  ||  || June 25, 1979 || Siding Spring || E. F. Helin, S. J. Bus || FLO || align=right | 2.7 km || 
|-id=155 bgcolor=#d6d6d6
| 7155 || 1979 YN || — || December 23, 1979 || La Silla || H. Debehogne, E. R. Netto || EOS || align=right | 9.0 km || 
|-id=156 bgcolor=#E9E9E9
| 7156 Flaviofusipecci ||  ||  || March 4, 1981 || La Silla || H. Debehogne, G. DeSanctis || ADE || align=right | 12 km || 
|-id=157 bgcolor=#fefefe
| 7157 Lofgren ||  ||  || March 1, 1981 || Siding Spring || S. J. Bus || FLO || align=right | 3.3 km || 
|-id=158 bgcolor=#d6d6d6
| 7158 IRTF ||  ||  || March 1, 1981 || Siding Spring || S. J. Bus || EOS || align=right | 10 km || 
|-id=159 bgcolor=#fefefe
| 7159 Bobjoseph ||  ||  || March 1, 1981 || Siding Spring || S. J. Bus || FLO || align=right | 3.8 km || 
|-id=160 bgcolor=#fefefe
| 7160 Tokunaga ||  ||  || October 24, 1981 || Palomar || S. J. Bus || — || align=right | 5.1 km || 
|-id=161 bgcolor=#fefefe
| 7161 Golitsyn ||  ||  || October 25, 1982 || Nauchnij || L. V. Zhuravleva || NYS || align=right | 4.0 km || 
|-id=162 bgcolor=#fefefe
| 7162 Sidwell ||  ||  || November 15, 1982 || Anderson Mesa || E. Bowell || V || align=right | 2.8 km || 
|-id=163 bgcolor=#fefefe
| 7163 Barenboim || 1984 DB ||  || February 24, 1984 || Palomar || E. F. Helin, R. S. Dunbar || — || align=right | 2.6 km || 
|-id=164 bgcolor=#fefefe
| 7164 Babadzhanov || 1984 ET ||  || March 6, 1984 || Anderson Mesa || E. Bowell || — || align=right | 4.4 km || 
|-id=165 bgcolor=#E9E9E9
| 7165 Pendleton || 1985 RH ||  || September 14, 1985 || Anderson Mesa || E. Bowell || — || align=right | 7.0 km || 
|-id=166 bgcolor=#fefefe
| 7166 Kennedy || 1985 TR ||  || October 15, 1985 || Anderson Mesa || E. Bowell || — || align=right | 5.1 km || 
|-id=167 bgcolor=#d6d6d6
| 7167 Laupheim ||  ||  || October 12, 1985 || Palomar || C. S. Shoemaker, E. M. Shoemaker || — || align=right | 23 km || 
|-id=168 bgcolor=#fefefe
| 7168 ||  || — || August 28, 1986 || La Silla || H. Debehogne || — || align=right | 3.3 km || 
|-id=169 bgcolor=#fefefe
| 7169 Linda ||  ||  || October 4, 1986 || Anderson Mesa || E. Bowell || FLO || align=right | 3.5 km || 
|-id=170 bgcolor=#E9E9E9
| 7170 Livesey || 1987 MK ||  || June 30, 1987 || Siding Spring || R. H. McNaught || EUN || align=right | 9.7 km || 
|-id=171 bgcolor=#fefefe
| 7171 Arthurkraus ||  ||  || January 13, 1988 || Kleť || A. Mrkos || — || align=right | 9.7 km || 
|-id=172 bgcolor=#fefefe
| 7172 Multatuli ||  ||  || February 17, 1988 || La Silla || E. W. Elst || NYS || align=right | 3.9 km || 
|-id=173 bgcolor=#fefefe
| 7173 Sepkoski ||  ||  || August 15, 1988 || Palomar || C. S. Shoemaker, E. M. Shoemaker || H || align=right | 4.1 km || 
|-id=174 bgcolor=#d6d6d6
| 7174 Semois || 1988 SQ ||  || September 18, 1988 || La Silla || H. Debehogne || 3:2 || align=right | 26 km || 
|-id=175 bgcolor=#E9E9E9
| 7175 Janegoodall ||  ||  || October 11, 1988 || Kleť || Z. Vávrová || — || align=right | 6.5 km || 
|-id=176 bgcolor=#E9E9E9
| 7176 Kuniji || 1989 XH ||  || December 1, 1989 || Kitami || K. Endate, K. Watanabe || GEF || align=right | 6.7 km || 
|-id=177 bgcolor=#E9E9E9
| 7177 Melvyntaylor || 1990 TF ||  || October 9, 1990 || Siding Spring || R. H. McNaught || EUN || align=right | 7.4 km || 
|-id=178 bgcolor=#fefefe
| 7178 Ikuookamoto ||  ||  || November 11, 1990 || Minami-Oda || T. Nomura, K. Kawanishi || — || align=right | 4.6 km || 
|-id=179 bgcolor=#d6d6d6
| 7179 Gassendi ||  ||  || April 8, 1991 || La Silla || E. W. Elst || — || align=right | 7.0 km || 
|-id=180 bgcolor=#d6d6d6
| 7180 ||  || — || July 12, 1991 || Palomar || H. E. Holt || EOS || align=right | 8.9 km || 
|-id=181 bgcolor=#d6d6d6
| 7181 ||  || — || August 7, 1991 || Palomar || H. E. Holt || slow || align=right | 15 km || 
|-id=182 bgcolor=#d6d6d6
| 7182 Robinvaughan ||  ||  || September 8, 1991 || Palomar || E. F. Helin || — || align=right | 15 km || 
|-id=183 bgcolor=#d6d6d6
| 7183 ||  || — || September 15, 1991 || Palomar || H. E. Holt || EOSslow || align=right | 12 km || 
|-id=184 bgcolor=#E9E9E9
| 7184 ||  || — || September 11, 1991 || Palomar || H. E. Holt || — || align=right | 6.4 km || 
|-id=185 bgcolor=#fefefe
| 7185 ||  || — || November 4, 1991 || Kushiro || S. Ueda, H. Kaneda || — || align=right | 4.4 km || 
|-id=186 bgcolor=#fefefe
| 7186 Tomioka || 1991 YF ||  || December 26, 1991 || Kitami || K. Endate, K. Watanabe || — || align=right | 13 km || 
|-id=187 bgcolor=#fefefe
| 7187 Isobe || 1992 BW ||  || January 30, 1992 || Palomar || E. F. Helin || Hmoon || align=right | 5.4 km || 
|-id=188 bgcolor=#fefefe
| 7188 Yoshii ||  ||  || September 23, 1992 || Kitami || K. Endate, K. Watanabe || slow? || align=right | 4.1 km || 
|-id=189 bgcolor=#fefefe
| 7189 Kuniko ||  ||  || September 28, 1992 || Kitami || K. Endate, K. Watanabe || — || align=right | 4.0 km || 
|-id=190 bgcolor=#fefefe
| 7190 ||  || — || April 15, 1993 || Palomar || H. E. Holt || — || align=right | 3.8 km || 
|-id=191 bgcolor=#E9E9E9
| 7191 ||  || — || June 18, 1993 || Palomar || H. E. Holt || — || align=right | 11 km || 
|-id=192 bgcolor=#d6d6d6
| 7192 Cieletespace ||  ||  || September 12, 1993 || Kitami || K. Endate, K. Watanabe || — || align=right | 15 km || 
|-id=193 bgcolor=#d6d6d6
| 7193 Yamaoka ||  ||  || September 19, 1993 || Kitami || K. Endate, K. Watanabe || — || align=right | 8.3 km || 
|-id=194 bgcolor=#E9E9E9
| 7194 Susanrose ||  ||  || September 18, 1993 || Palomar || H. E. Holt || — || align=right | 7.1 km || 
|-id=195 bgcolor=#fefefe
| 7195 Danboice || 1994 AJ ||  || January 2, 1994 || Oizumi || T. Kobayashi || — || align=right | 5.5 km || 
|-id=196 bgcolor=#fefefe
| 7196 Baroni || 1994 BF ||  || January 16, 1994 || Cima Ekar || A. Boattini, M. Tombelli || — || align=right | 4.9 km || 
|-id=197 bgcolor=#E9E9E9
| 7197 Pieroangela || 1994 BH ||  || January 16, 1994 || Cima Ekar || A. Boattini, M. Tombelli || — || align=right | 5.2 km || 
|-id=198 bgcolor=#E9E9E9
| 7198 Montelupo || 1994 BJ ||  || January 16, 1994 || Cima Ekar || A. Boattini, M. Tombelli || EUN || align=right | 9.7 km || 
|-id=199 bgcolor=#d6d6d6
| 7199 Brianza || 1994 FR ||  || March 28, 1994 || Sormano || M. Cavagna, V. Giuliani || KOR || align=right | 5.6 km || 
|-id=200 bgcolor=#d6d6d6
| 7200 || 1994 NO || — || July 8, 1994 || Catalina Station || T. B. Spahr || — || align=right | 11 km || 
|}

7201–7300 

|-bgcolor=#fefefe
| 7201 Kuritariku ||  ||  || October 25, 1994 || Kiyosato || S. Otomo || V || align=right | 5.5 km || 
|-id=202 bgcolor=#E9E9E9
| 7202 Kigoshi ||  ||  || February 19, 1995 || Ojima || T. Niijima, T. Urata || — || align=right | 9.9 km || 
|-id=203 bgcolor=#fefefe
| 7203 Sigeki ||  ||  || February 27, 1995 || Kiyosato || S. Otomo || — || align=right | 5.8 km || 
|-id=204 bgcolor=#E9E9E9
| 7204 Ondřejov || 1995 GH ||  || April 3, 1995 || Ondřejov || P. Pravec || — || align=right | 5.7 km || 
|-id=205 bgcolor=#E9E9E9
| 7205 Sadanori ||  ||  || December 21, 1995 || Oizumi || T. Kobayashi || — || align=right | 5.3 km || 
|-id=206 bgcolor=#d6d6d6
| 7206 Shiki || 1996 QT ||  || August 18, 1996 || Kuma Kogen || A. Nakamura || EOS || align=right | 9.9 km || 
|-id=207 bgcolor=#E9E9E9
| 7207 Hammurabi || 2133 P-L ||  || September 24, 1960 || Palomar || PLS || — || align=right | 4.0 km || 
|-id=208 bgcolor=#fefefe
| 7208 Ashurbanipal || 2645 P-L ||  || September 24, 1960 || Palomar || PLS || — || align=right | 5.0 km || 
|-id=209 bgcolor=#E9E9E9
| 7209 Cyrus || 3523 P-L ||  || October 17, 1960 || Palomar || PLS || — || align=right | 6.4 km || 
|-id=210 bgcolor=#d6d6d6
| 7210 Darius || 6555 P-L ||  || September 24, 1960 || Palomar || PLS || KOR || align=right | 8.3 km || 
|-id=211 bgcolor=#E9E9E9
| 7211 Xerxes || 1240 T-1 ||  || March 25, 1971 || Palomar || PLS || GEF || align=right | 6.4 km || 
|-id=212 bgcolor=#fefefe
| 7212 Artaxerxes || 2155 T-2 ||  || September 29, 1973 || Palomar || PLS || FLO || align=right | 2.7 km || 
|-id=213 bgcolor=#E9E9E9
| 7213 Conae || 1967 KB ||  || May 31, 1967 || El Leoncito || Félix Aguilar Obs. || — || align=right | 4.3 km || 
|-id=214 bgcolor=#C2FFFF
| 7214 Anticlus ||  ||  || September 19, 1973 || Palomar || PLS || L4 || align=right | 20 km || 
|-id=215 bgcolor=#d6d6d6
| 7215 Gerhard || 1977 FS ||  || March 16, 1977 || La Silla || H.-E. Schuster || ALA || align=right | 24 km || 
|-id=216 bgcolor=#fefefe
| 7216 Ishkov ||  ||  || August 21, 1977 || Nauchnij || N. S. Chernykh || — || align=right | 3.3 km || 
|-id=217 bgcolor=#d6d6d6
| 7217 Dacke ||  ||  || August 22, 1979 || La Silla || C.-I. Lagerkvist || — || align=right | 24 km || 
|-id=218 bgcolor=#fefefe
| 7218 Skácel || 1979 SK ||  || September 19, 1979 || Kleť || J. Květoň || — || align=right | 3.4 km || 
|-id=219 bgcolor=#E9E9E9
| 7219 Satterwhite ||  ||  || March 3, 1981 || Siding Spring || S. J. Bus || — || align=right | 2.9 km || 
|-id=220 bgcolor=#fefefe
| 7220 Philnicholson || 1981 QE ||  || August 30, 1981 || Anderson Mesa || E. Bowell || MAS || align=right | 3.5 km || 
|-id=221 bgcolor=#fefefe
| 7221 Sallaba || 1981 SJ ||  || September 22, 1981 || Kleť || Z. Vávrová || NYS || align=right | 2.6 km || 
|-id=222 bgcolor=#d6d6d6
| 7222 Alekperov ||  ||  || October 7, 1981 || Nauchnij || T. M. Smirnova || — || align=right | 16 km || 
|-id=223 bgcolor=#fefefe
| 7223 Dolgorukij ||  ||  || October 14, 1982 || Nauchnij || L. V. Zhuravleva, L. G. Karachkina || — || align=right | 4.0 km || 
|-id=224 bgcolor=#E9E9E9
| 7224 Vesnina ||  ||  || October 15, 1982 || Nauchnij || L. V. Zhuravleva || — || align=right | 9.9 km || 
|-id=225 bgcolor=#fefefe
| 7225 Huntress || 1983 BH ||  || January 22, 1983 || Anderson Mesa || E. Bowell || moon || align=right | 6.7 km || 
|-id=226 bgcolor=#d6d6d6
| 7226 Kryl || 1984 QJ ||  || August 21, 1984 || Kleť || A. Mrkos || THM || align=right | 16 km || 
|-id=227 bgcolor=#fefefe
| 7227 ||  || — || September 22, 1984 || La Silla || H. Debehogne || — || align=right | 3.8 km || 
|-id=228 bgcolor=#fefefe
| 7228 MacGillivray || 1985 GO ||  || April 15, 1985 || Anderson Mesa || E. Bowell || FLO || align=right | 4.2 km || 
|-id=229 bgcolor=#fefefe
| 7229 Tonimoore || 1985 RV ||  || September 12, 1985 || Kitt Peak || Spacewatch || CHL || align=right | 4.8 km || 
|-id=230 bgcolor=#fefefe
| 7230 Lutz ||  ||  || September 12, 1985 || Anderson Mesa || E. Bowell || — || align=right | 4.9 km || 
|-id=231 bgcolor=#d6d6d6
| 7231 Porco ||  ||  || October 15, 1985 || Anderson Mesa || E. Bowell || VER || align=right | 18 km || 
|-id=232 bgcolor=#fefefe
| 7232 Nabokov || 1985 UQ ||  || October 20, 1985 || Kleť || A. Mrkos || — || align=right | 7.6 km || 
|-id=233 bgcolor=#E9E9E9
| 7233 Majella ||  ||  || March 7, 1986 || La Silla || G. DeSanctis || — || align=right | 14 km || 
|-id=234 bgcolor=#fefefe
| 7234 ||  || — || August 29, 1986 || La Silla || H. Debehogne || — || align=right | 4.6 km || 
|-id=235 bgcolor=#fefefe
| 7235 Hitsuzan || 1986 UY ||  || October 30, 1986 || Geisei || T. Seki || FLO || align=right | 3.1 km || 
|-id=236 bgcolor=#FFC2E0
| 7236 || 1987 PA || — || August 1, 1987 || Palomar || J. Phinney || AMOcritical || align=right data-sort-value="0.78" | 780 m || 
|-id=237 bgcolor=#E9E9E9
| 7237 Vickyhamilton || 1988 VH ||  || November 3, 1988 || Toyota || K. Suzuki, T. Furuta || — || align=right | 7.5 km || 
|-id=238 bgcolor=#fefefe
| 7238 Kobori || 1989 OA ||  || July 27, 1989 || Kani || Y. Mizuno, T. Furuta || — || align=right | 4.9 km || 
|-id=239 bgcolor=#fefefe
| 7239 Mobberley || 1989 TE ||  || October 4, 1989 || Stakenbridge || B. G. W. Manning || — || align=right | 2.8 km || 
|-id=240 bgcolor=#fefefe
| 7240 Hasebe || 1989 YG ||  || December 19, 1989 || Kani || Y. Mizuno, T. Furuta || — || align=right | 3.3 km || 
|-id=241 bgcolor=#fefefe
| 7241 Kuroda ||  ||  || November 11, 1990 || Kitami || K. Endate, K. Watanabe || — || align=right | 4.8 km || 
|-id=242 bgcolor=#fefefe
| 7242 Okyudo ||  ||  || November 11, 1990 || Kitami || K. Endate, K. Watanabe || — || align=right | 2.7 km || 
|-id=243 bgcolor=#fefefe
| 7243 ||  || — || November 12, 1990 || Kushiro || S. Ueda, H. Kaneda || — || align=right | 4.8 km || 
|-id=244 bgcolor=#d6d6d6
| 7244 Villa-Lobos ||  ||  || August 5, 1991 || La Silla || E. W. Elst || KOR || align=right | 7.5 km || 
|-id=245 bgcolor=#E9E9E9
| 7245 ||  || — || September 10, 1991 || Palomar || H. E. Holt || — || align=right | 8.1 km || 
|-id=246 bgcolor=#d6d6d6
| 7246 ||  || — || September 12, 1991 || Palomar || H. E. Holt || — || align=right | 12 km || 
|-id=247 bgcolor=#fefefe
| 7247 Robertstirling ||  ||  || October 12, 1991 || Siding Spring || R. H. McNaught || H || align=right | 2.6 km || 
|-id=248 bgcolor=#fefefe
| 7248 Älvsjö ||  ||  || March 1, 1992 || La Silla || UESAC || FLO || align=right | 3.4 km || 
|-id=249 bgcolor=#E9E9E9
| 7249 || 1992 SN || — || September 26, 1992 || Dynic || A. Sugie || — || align=right | 8.4 km || 
|-id=250 bgcolor=#E9E9E9
| 7250 Kinoshita ||  ||  || September 23, 1992 || Kitami || K. Endate, K. Watanabe || — || align=right | 5.5 km || 
|-id=251 bgcolor=#E9E9E9
| 7251 Kuwabara ||  ||  || September 30, 1992 || Kitami || K. Endate, K. Watanabe || — || align=right | 4.8 km || 
|-id=252 bgcolor=#E9E9E9
| 7252 Kakegawa || 1992 UZ ||  || October 21, 1992 || Oohira || T. Urata || MIT || align=right | 10 km || 
|-id=253 bgcolor=#d6d6d6
| 7253 Nara || 1993 CL ||  || February 13, 1993 || Kashihara || F. Uto || — || align=right | 22 km || 
|-id=254 bgcolor=#fefefe
| 7254 Kuratani ||  ||  || October 15, 1993 || Kitami || K. Endate, K. Watanabe || — || align=right | 3.3 km || 
|-id=255 bgcolor=#fefefe
| 7255 ||  || — || November 11, 1993 || Kushiro || S. Ueda, H. Kaneda || FLO || align=right | 6.6 km || 
|-id=256 bgcolor=#fefefe
| 7256 Bonhoeffer ||  ||  || November 11, 1993 || Tautenburg Observatory || F. Börngen || — || align=right | 4.8 km || 
|-id=257 bgcolor=#fefefe
| 7257 Yoshiya ||  ||  || January 7, 1994 || Oizumi || T. Kobayashi || — || align=right | 5.2 km || 
|-id=258 bgcolor=#E9E9E9
| 7258 Pettarin || 1994 EF ||  || March 5, 1994 || Stroncone || Santa Lucia Obs. || EUN || align=right | 6.6 km || 
|-id=259 bgcolor=#E9E9E9
| 7259 Gaithersburg ||  ||  || March 6, 1994 || Nachi-Katsuura || Y. Shimizu, T. Urata || EUN || align=right | 6.9 km || 
|-id=260 bgcolor=#d6d6d6
| 7260 Metelli || 1994 FN ||  || March 18, 1994 || Stroncone || Santa Lucia Obs. || KOR || align=right | 6.4 km || 
|-id=261 bgcolor=#E9E9E9
| 7261 Yokootakeo || 1994 GZ ||  || April 14, 1994 || Oizumi || T. Kobayashi || — || align=right | 8.1 km || 
|-id=262 bgcolor=#fefefe
| 7262 Sofue ||  ||  || January 27, 1995 || Oizumi || T. Kobayashi || — || align=right | 5.4 km || 
|-id=263 bgcolor=#fefefe
| 7263 Takayamada || 1995 DP ||  || February 21, 1995 || Oizumi || T. Kobayashi || — || align=right | 3.5 km || 
|-id=264 bgcolor=#fefefe
| 7264 Hirohatanaka || 1995 FK ||  || March 26, 1995 || Nachi-Katsuura || Y. Shimizu, T. Urata || — || align=right | 3.1 km || 
|-id=265 bgcolor=#fefefe
| 7265 Edithmüller || 2908 T-2 ||  || September 30, 1973 || Palomar || PLS || V || align=right | 3.4 km || 
|-id=266 bgcolor=#fefefe
| 7266 Trefftz || 4270 T-2 ||  || September 29, 1973 || Palomar || PLS || NYS || align=right | 3.2 km || 
|-id=267 bgcolor=#FA8072
| 7267 Victormeen || 1943 DF ||  || February 23, 1943 || Turku || L. Oterma || — || align=right | 4.4 km || 
|-id=268 bgcolor=#fefefe
| 7268 Chigorin || 1972 TF ||  || October 3, 1972 || Nauchnij || L. V. Zhuravleva || — || align=right | 4.5 km || 
|-id=269 bgcolor=#d6d6d6
| 7269 Alprokhorov ||  ||  || November 2, 1975 || Nauchnij || T. M. Smirnova || — || align=right | 6.9 km || 
|-id=270 bgcolor=#d6d6d6
| 7270 Punkin ||  ||  || July 7, 1978 || Palomar || E. Bowell || THM || align=right | 15 km || 
|-id=271 bgcolor=#d6d6d6
| 7271 Doroguntsov ||  ||  || September 22, 1979 || Nauchnij || N. S. Chernykh || — || align=right | 7.8 km || 
|-id=272 bgcolor=#E9E9E9
| 7272 Darbydyar ||  ||  || February 21, 1980 || Kleť || Z. Vávrová || GEF || align=right | 8.0 km || 
|-id=273 bgcolor=#E9E9E9
| 7273 Garyhuss ||  ||  || March 2, 1981 || Siding Spring || S. J. Bus || EUN || align=right | 4.7 km || 
|-id=274 bgcolor=#fefefe
| 7274 Washioyama || 1982 FC ||  || March 21, 1982 || Geisei || T. Seki || KLI || align=right | 8.8 km || 
|-id=275 bgcolor=#d6d6d6
| 7275 Earlcarpenter ||  ||  || February 15, 1983 || Anderson Mesa || N. G. Thomas || EOS || align=right | 13 km || 
|-id=276 bgcolor=#fefefe
| 7276 Maymie || 1983 RE ||  || September 4, 1983 || Harvard Observatory || Oak Ridge Observatory || FLO || align=right | 3.8 km || 
|-id=277 bgcolor=#E9E9E9
| 7277 Klass ||  ||  || September 4, 1983 || Anderson Mesa || E. Bowell || MIS || align=right | 8.9 km || 
|-id=278 bgcolor=#d6d6d6
| 7278 Shtokolov ||  ||  || October 22, 1985 || Nauchnij || L. V. Zhuravleva || — || align=right | 20 km || 
|-id=279 bgcolor=#d6d6d6
| 7279 Hagfors ||  ||  || November 7, 1985 || Anderson Mesa || E. Bowell || HYG || align=right | 13 km || 
|-id=280 bgcolor=#E9E9E9
| 7280 Bergengruen ||  ||  || September 8, 1988 || Tautenburg Observatory || F. Börngen || — || align=right | 3.3 km || 
|-id=281 bgcolor=#fefefe
| 7281 ||  || — || September 2, 1988 || La Silla || H. Debehogne || NYS || align=right | 3.9 km || 
|-id=282 bgcolor=#E9E9E9
| 7282 || 1989 BC || — || January 29, 1989 || Kushiro || S. Ueda, H. Kaneda || — || align=right | 14 km || 
|-id=283 bgcolor=#fefefe
| 7283 ||  || — || October 4, 1989 || La Silla || H. Debehogne || FLO || align=right | 3.4 km || 
|-id=284 bgcolor=#d6d6d6
| 7284 || 1989 VW || — || November 4, 1989 || Gekko || Y. Oshima || 3:2 || align=right | 23 km || 
|-id=285 bgcolor=#E9E9E9
| 7285 Seggewiss ||  ||  || March 2, 1990 || La Silla || E. W. Elst || ADE || align=right | 7.0 km || 
|-id=286 bgcolor=#d6d6d6
| 7286 ||  || — || August 24, 1990 || Palomar || H. E. Holt || — || align=right | 22 km || 
|-id=287 bgcolor=#d6d6d6
| 7287 Yokokurayama ||  ||  || November 10, 1990 || Geisei || T. Seki || — || align=right | 14 km || 
|-id=288 bgcolor=#fefefe
| 7288 ||  || — || March 18, 1991 || Dynic || A. Sugie || FLO || align=right | 5.5 km || 
|-id=289 bgcolor=#fefefe
| 7289 Kamegamori || 1991 JU ||  || May 5, 1991 || Geisei || T. Seki || — || align=right | 5.3 km || 
|-id=290 bgcolor=#E9E9E9
| 7290 Johnrather ||  ||  || May 11, 1991 || Palomar || E. F. Helin || — || align=right | 7.1 km || 
|-id=291 bgcolor=#d6d6d6
| 7291 Hyakutake ||  ||  || December 13, 1991 || Kiyosato || S. Otomo || — || align=right | 16 km || 
|-id=292 bgcolor=#fefefe
| 7292 Prosperin ||  ||  || March 1, 1992 || La Silla || UESAC || — || align=right | 4.2 km || 
|-id=293 bgcolor=#fefefe
| 7293 Kazuyuki || 1992 FH ||  || March 23, 1992 || Kitami || K. Endate, K. Watanabe || FLO || align=right | 4.5 km || 
|-id=294 bgcolor=#E9E9E9
| 7294 Barbaraakey || 1992 LM ||  || June 3, 1992 || Palomar || G. J. Leonard || — || align=right | 7.0 km || 
|-id=295 bgcolor=#fefefe
| 7295 Brozovic || 1992 MB ||  || June 22, 1992 || Kushiro || S. Ueda, H. Kaneda || — || align=right | 5.6 km || 
|-id=296 bgcolor=#fefefe
| 7296 Lamarck ||  ||  || August 8, 1992 || Caussols || E. W. Elst, C. Pollas || — || align=right | 3.7 km || 
|-id=297 bgcolor=#E9E9E9
| 7297 || 1992 UG || — || October 21, 1992 || Dynic || A. Sugie || — || align=right | 5.9 km || 
|-id=298 bgcolor=#E9E9E9
| 7298 Matudaira-gou ||  ||  || November 26, 1992 || Toyota || K. Suzuki, T. Urata || — || align=right | 5.0 km || 
|-id=299 bgcolor=#E9E9E9
| 7299 Indiawadkins ||  ||  || November 21, 1992 || Palomar || E. F. Helin || — || align=right | 12 km || 
|-id=300 bgcolor=#E9E9E9
| 7300 Yoshisada ||  ||  || December 26, 1992 || Oohira || T. Urata || — || align=right | 6.6 km || 
|}

7301–7400 

|-bgcolor=#E9E9E9
| 7301 Matsuitakafumi || 1993 AB ||  || January 2, 1993 || Yakiimo || A. Natori, T. Urata || — || align=right | 6.2 km || 
|-id=302 bgcolor=#E9E9E9
| 7302 || 1993 CQ || — || February 10, 1993 || Kushiro || S. Ueda, H. Kaneda || — || align=right | 8.4 km || 
|-id=303 bgcolor=#d6d6d6
| 7303 ||  || — || March 25, 1993 || Kushiro || S. Ueda, H. Kaneda || — || align=right | 13 km || 
|-id=304 bgcolor=#FA8072
| 7304 Namiki ||  ||  || January 9, 1994 || Oizumi || T. Kobayashi || — || align=right | 7.1 km || 
|-id=305 bgcolor=#E9E9E9
| 7305 Ossakajusto ||  ||  || February 8, 1994 || Kitami || K. Endate, K. Watanabe || — || align=right | 24 km || 
|-id=306 bgcolor=#E9E9E9
| 7306 Panizon || 1994 EH ||  || March 6, 1994 || Stroncone || Santa Lucia Obs. || BAR || align=right | 5.3 km || 
|-id=307 bgcolor=#E9E9E9
| 7307 Takei ||  ||  || April 13, 1994 || Nachi-Katsuura || Y. Shimizu, T. Urata || moon || align=right | 17 km || 
|-id=308 bgcolor=#d6d6d6
| 7308 Hattori ||  ||  || January 31, 1995 || Nachi-Katsuura || Y. Shimizu, T. Urata || EOS || align=right | 10 km || 
|-id=309 bgcolor=#fefefe
| 7309 Shinkawakami || 1995 FU ||  || March 28, 1995 || Oizumi || T. Kobayashi || — || align=right | 5.6 km || 
|-id=310 bgcolor=#E9E9E9
| 7310 ||  || — || July 19, 1995 || Xinglong || SCAP || — || align=right | 9.3 km || 
|-id=311 bgcolor=#d6d6d6
| 7311 Hildehan || 1995 TU ||  || October 14, 1995 || Sudbury || D. di Cicco || KOR || align=right | 6.2 km || 
|-id=312 bgcolor=#E9E9E9
| 7312 ||  || — || January 13, 1996 || Kushiro || S. Ueda, H. Kaneda || — || align=right | 8.0 km || 
|-id=313 bgcolor=#E9E9E9
| 7313 Pisano || 6207 P-L ||  || September 24, 1960 || Palomar || PLS || — || align=right | 2.8 km || 
|-id=314 bgcolor=#d6d6d6
| 7314 Pevsner || 2146 T-1 ||  || March 25, 1971 || Palomar || PLS || THM || align=right | 11 km || 
|-id=315 bgcolor=#E9E9E9
| 7315 Kolbe || 1136 T-2 ||  || September 29, 1973 || Palomar || PLS || — || align=right | 5.6 km || 
|-id=316 bgcolor=#E9E9E9
| 7316 Hajdu || 3145 T-2 ||  || September 30, 1973 || Palomar || PLS || — || align=right | 5.4 km || 
|-id=317 bgcolor=#fefefe
| 7317 Cabot || 1940 ED ||  || March 12, 1940 || Konkoly || G. Kulin || — || align=right | 5.4 km || 
|-id=318 bgcolor=#E9E9E9
| 7318 Dyukov || 1969 OX ||  || July 17, 1969 || Nauchnij || B. A. Burnasheva || EUN || align=right | 7.7 km || 
|-id=319 bgcolor=#fefefe
| 7319 Katterfeld ||  ||  || September 24, 1976 || Nauchnij || N. S. Chernykh || — || align=right | 5.1 km || 
|-id=320 bgcolor=#d6d6d6
| 7320 Potter ||  ||  || October 2, 1978 || Nauchnij || L. V. Zhuravleva || — || align=right | 12 km || 
|-id=321 bgcolor=#E9E9E9
| 7321 Minervahoyt ||  ||  || June 25, 1979 || Siding Spring || E. F. Helin, S. J. Bus || — || align=right | 5.2 km || 
|-id=322 bgcolor=#d6d6d6
| 7322 Lavrentina ||  ||  || September 22, 1979 || Nauchnij || N. S. Chernykh || — || align=right | 15 km || 
|-id=323 bgcolor=#d6d6d6
| 7323 Robersomma ||  ||  || September 22, 1979 || Nauchnij || N. S. Chernykh || — || align=right | 13 km || 
|-id=324 bgcolor=#fefefe
| 7324 Carret || 1981 BC ||  || January 31, 1981 || Harvard Observatory || Harvard Obs. || — || align=right | 5.7 km || 
|-id=325 bgcolor=#fefefe
| 7325 ||  || — || August 28, 1981 || Kleť || Z. Vávrová || — || align=right | 6.5 km || 
|-id=326 bgcolor=#fefefe
| 7326 Tedbunch ||  ||  || October 24, 1981 || Palomar || S. J. Bus || — || align=right | 4.5 km || 
|-id=327 bgcolor=#fefefe
| 7327 Crawford ||  ||  || September 6, 1983 || Anderson Mesa || E. Bowell || FLO || align=right | 3.2 km || 
|-id=328 bgcolor=#E9E9E9
| 7328 Casanova ||  ||  || September 20, 1984 || Kleť || A. Mrkos || EUN || align=right | 5.8 km || 
|-id=329 bgcolor=#E9E9E9
| 7329 Bettadotto || 1985 GK ||  || April 14, 1985 || Anderson Mesa || E. Bowell || EUN || align=right | 7.4 km || 
|-id=330 bgcolor=#FA8072
| 7330 Annelemaître || 1985 TD ||  || October 15, 1985 || Anderson Mesa || E. Bowell || PHO || align=right | 4.3 km || 
|-id=331 bgcolor=#d6d6d6
| 7331 Balindblad || 1985 TV ||  || October 15, 1985 || Anderson Mesa || E. Bowell || ALA || align=right | 22 km || 
|-id=332 bgcolor=#fefefe
| 7332 Ponrepo ||  ||  || December 4, 1986 || Kleť || A. Mrkos || — || align=right | 3.7 km || 
|-id=333 bgcolor=#E9E9E9
| 7333 Bec-Borsenberger ||  ||  || September 29, 1987 || Anderson Mesa || E. Bowell || — || align=right | 8.2 km || 
|-id=334 bgcolor=#fefefe
| 7334 Sciurus || 1988 QV ||  || August 17, 1988 || Kleť || A. Mrkos || V || align=right | 4.1 km || 
|-id=335 bgcolor=#FFC2E0
| 7335 || 1989 JA || — || May 1, 1989 || Palomar || E. F. Helin || APO +1kmPHA || align=right | 1.8 km || 
|-id=336 bgcolor=#FFC2E0
| 7336 Saunders ||  ||  || September 6, 1989 || Palomar || E. F. Helin || AMO || align=right data-sort-value="0.62" | 620 m || 
|-id=337 bgcolor=#fefefe
| 7337 ||  || — || August 22, 1990 || Palomar || H. E. Holt || — || align=right | 4.7 km || 
|-id=338 bgcolor=#d6d6d6
| 7338 ||  || — || November 12, 1990 || Fujieda || H. Shiozawa, M. Kizawa || EOS || align=right | 11 km || 
|-id=339 bgcolor=#E9E9E9
| 7339 ||  || — || September 15, 1991 || Palomar || H. E. Holt || — || align=right | 11 km || 
|-id=340 bgcolor=#d6d6d6
| 7340 ||  || — || October 29, 1991 || Kushiro || S. Ueda, H. Kaneda || KOR || align=right | 5.6 km || 
|-id=341 bgcolor=#FFC2E0
| 7341 || 1991 VK || — || November 1, 1991 || Palomar || E. F. Helin, K. J. Lawrence || APO +1kmPHA || align=right data-sort-value="0.98" | 980 m || 
|-id=342 bgcolor=#E9E9E9
| 7342 Uchinoura ||  ||  || March 23, 1992 || Kitami || K. Endate, K. Watanabe || EUN || align=right | 6.0 km || 
|-id=343 bgcolor=#fefefe
| 7343 Ockeghem ||  ||  || April 4, 1992 || La Silla || E. W. Elst || FLO || align=right | 3.9 km || 
|-id=344 bgcolor=#E9E9E9
| 7344 Summerfield || 1992 LU ||  || June 4, 1992 || Palomar || C. S. Shoemaker, D. H. Levy || moon || align=right | 6.3 km || 
|-id=345 bgcolor=#FA8072
| 7345 Happer || 1992 OF ||  || July 28, 1992 || Siding Spring || R. H. McNaught || — || align=right | 3.3 km || 
|-id=346 bgcolor=#d6d6d6
| 7346 Boulanger ||  ||  || February 20, 1993 || Caussols || E. W. Elst || KOR || align=right | 7.4 km || 
|-id=347 bgcolor=#d6d6d6
| 7347 || 1993 EW || — || March 12, 1993 || Kushiro || S. Ueda, H. Kaneda || THM || align=right | 13 km || 
|-id=348 bgcolor=#d6d6d6
| 7348 ||  || — || March 21, 1993 || La Silla || UESAC || THM || align=right | 13 km || 
|-id=349 bgcolor=#E9E9E9
| 7349 Ernestmaes ||  ||  || August 18, 1993 || Caussols || E. W. Elst || HEN || align=right | 7.8 km || 
|-id=350 bgcolor=#FFC2E0
| 7350 || 1993 VA || — || November 7, 1993 || Siding Spring || R. H. McNaught || APO +1km || align=right | 1.9 km || 
|-id=351 bgcolor=#E9E9E9
| 7351 Yoshidamichi ||  ||  || December 12, 1993 || Oizumi || T. Kobayashi || — || align=right | 8.8 km || 
|-id=352 bgcolor=#C2FFFF
| 7352 Hypsenor || 1994 CO ||  || February 4, 1994 || Kushiro || S. Ueda, H. Kaneda || L5slow || align=right | 48 km || 
|-id=353 bgcolor=#E9E9E9
| 7353 Kazuya ||  ||  || January 6, 1995 || Nyukasa || M. Hirasawa, S. Suzuki || KAZ || align=right | 11 km || 
|-id=354 bgcolor=#d6d6d6
| 7354 Ishiguro ||  ||  || January 27, 1995 || Oizumi || T. Kobayashi || — || align=right | 7.5 km || 
|-id=355 bgcolor=#fefefe
| 7355 Bottke ||  ||  || April 25, 1995 || Kitt Peak || Spacewatch || — || align=right | 5.1 km || 
|-id=356 bgcolor=#E9E9E9
| 7356 Casagrande ||  ||  || September 27, 1995 || Stroncone || Santa Lucia Obs. || EUN || align=right | 4.6 km || 
|-id=357 bgcolor=#fefefe
| 7357 ||  || — || October 27, 1995 || Kushiro || S. Ueda, H. Kaneda || FLO || align=right | 4.0 km || 
|-id=358 bgcolor=#FFC2E0
| 7358 Oze ||  ||  || December 27, 1995 || Oizumi || T. Kobayashi || AMO +1km || align=right | 4.1 km || 
|-id=359 bgcolor=#d6d6d6
| 7359 Messier || 1996 BH ||  || January 16, 1996 || Kleť || M. Tichý || — || align=right | 12 km || 
|-id=360 bgcolor=#fefefe
| 7360 Moberg ||  ||  || January 30, 1996 || La Silla || C.-I. Lagerkvist || FLO || align=right | 6.0 km || 
|-id=361 bgcolor=#E9E9E9
| 7361 Endres ||  ||  || February 16, 1996 || Haleakalā || NEAT || — || align=right | 5.2 km || 
|-id=362 bgcolor=#fefefe
| 7362 Rogerbyrd || 1996 EY ||  || March 15, 1996 || Haleakalā || NEAT || NYS || align=right | 3.5 km || 
|-id=363 bgcolor=#E9E9E9
| 7363 Esquibel ||  ||  || March 18, 1996 || Haleakalā || NEAT || GEF || align=right | 8.3 km || 
|-id=364 bgcolor=#fefefe
| 7364 Otonkučera || 1996 KS ||  || May 22, 1996 || Višnjan Observatory || K. Korlević || — || align=right | 1.9 km || 
|-id=365 bgcolor=#fefefe
| 7365 Sejong ||  ||  || August 18, 1996 || JCPM Sapporo || K. Watanabe || — || align=right | 5.5 km || 
|-id=366 bgcolor=#d6d6d6
| 7366 Agata || 1996 UY ||  || October 20, 1996 || Oizumi || T. Kobayashi || HYG || align=right | 24 km || 
|-id=367 bgcolor=#d6d6d6
| 7367 Giotto || 3077 T-1 ||  || March 26, 1971 || Palomar || PLS || THM || align=right | 7.8 km || 
|-id=368 bgcolor=#fefefe
| 7368 Haldancohn || 1966 BB ||  || January 20, 1966 || Brooklyn || Indiana University || — || align=right | 4.5 km || 
|-id=369 bgcolor=#FA8072
| 7369 Gavrilin || 1975 AN ||  || January 13, 1975 || Nauchnij || T. M. Smirnova || PHOmoon || align=right | 4.9 km || 
|-id=370 bgcolor=#E9E9E9
| 7370 Krasnogolovets ||  ||  || September 27, 1978 || Nauchnij || L. I. Chernykh || — || align=right | 7.7 km || 
|-id=371 bgcolor=#d6d6d6
| 7371 El-Baz ||  ||  || November 7, 1978 || Palomar || E. F. Helin, S. J. Bus || THM || align=right | 9.2 km || 
|-id=372 bgcolor=#d6d6d6
| 7372 Emimar || 1979 HH ||  || April 19, 1979 || Cerro Tololo || J. C. Muzzio || KOR || align=right | 9.5 km || 
|-id=373 bgcolor=#d6d6d6
| 7373 Stashis ||  ||  || August 27, 1979 || Nauchnij || N. S. Chernykh || — || align=right | 9.9 km || 
|-id=374 bgcolor=#E9E9E9
| 7374 || 1980 DL || — || February 19, 1980 || Kleť || Z. Vávrová || — || align=right | 2.7 km || 
|-id=375 bgcolor=#fefefe
| 7375 || 1980 PZ || — || August 14, 1980 || Kleť || Z. Vávrová || — || align=right | 4.9 km || 
|-id=376 bgcolor=#fefefe
| 7376 Jefftaylor ||  ||  || October 31, 1980 || Palomar || S. J. Bus || NYS || align=right | 5.4 km || 
|-id=377 bgcolor=#fefefe
| 7377 Pizzarello ||  ||  || March 1, 1981 || Siding Spring || S. J. Bus || FLO || align=right | 1.9 km || 
|-id=378 bgcolor=#d6d6d6
| 7378 Herbertpalme ||  ||  || March 2, 1981 || Siding Spring || S. J. Bus || THM || align=right | 15 km || 
|-id=379 bgcolor=#E9E9E9
| 7379 Naoyaimae ||  ||  || March 1, 1981 || Siding Spring || S. J. Bus || — || align=right | 3.3 km || 
|-id=380 bgcolor=#fefefe
| 7380 || 1981 RF || — || September 3, 1981 || Anderson Mesa || N. G. Thomas || NYS || align=right | 9.1 km || 
|-id=381 bgcolor=#fefefe
| 7381 Mamontov ||  ||  || September 8, 1981 || Nauchnij || L. V. Zhuravleva || V || align=right | 4.1 km || 
|-id=382 bgcolor=#d6d6d6
| 7382 Bozhenkova ||  ||  || September 8, 1981 || Nauchnij || L. V. Zhuravleva || — || align=right | 13 km || 
|-id=383 bgcolor=#fefefe
| 7383 Lassovszky || 1981 SE ||  || September 30, 1981 || Harvard Observatory || Oak Ridge Observatory || — || align=right | 7.7 km || 
|-id=384 bgcolor=#E9E9E9
| 7384 || 1981 TJ || — || October 6, 1981 || Kleť || Z. Vávrová || — || align=right | 15 km || 
|-id=385 bgcolor=#fefefe
| 7385 Aktsynovia ||  ||  || October 22, 1981 || Nauchnij || N. S. Chernykh || — || align=right | 8.9 km || 
|-id=386 bgcolor=#fefefe
| 7386 Paulpellas || 1981 WM ||  || November 25, 1981 || Harvard Observatory || Oak Ridge Observatory || — || align=right | 5.0 km || 
|-id=387 bgcolor=#fefefe
| 7387 Malbil ||  ||  || January 30, 1982 || Anderson Mesa || E. Bowell || — || align=right | 6.3 km || 
|-id=388 bgcolor=#d6d6d6
| 7388 Marcomorelli ||  ||  || March 23, 1982 || La Silla || H. Debehogne || — || align=right | 16 km || 
|-id=389 bgcolor=#fefefe
| 7389 Michelcombes || 1982 UE ||  || October 17, 1982 || Anderson Mesa || E. Bowell || — || align=right | 4.2 km || 
|-id=390 bgcolor=#E9E9E9
| 7390 Kundera || 1983 QE ||  || August 31, 1983 || Kleť || Kleť Obs. || EUN || align=right | 5.6 km || 
|-id=391 bgcolor=#E9E9E9
| 7391 Strouhal ||  ||  || November 8, 1983 || Kleť || A. Mrkos || — || align=right | 6.1 km || 
|-id=392 bgcolor=#E9E9E9
| 7392 Kowalski || 1984 EX ||  || March 6, 1984 || Anderson Mesa || E. Bowell || — || align=right | 15 km || 
|-id=393 bgcolor=#fefefe
| 7393 Luginbuhl ||  ||  || September 28, 1984 || Anderson Mesa || B. A. Skiff || FLOmoon || align=right | 5.5 km || 
|-id=394 bgcolor=#d6d6d6
| 7394 Xanthomalitia ||  ||  || August 18, 1985 || Nauchnij || N. S. Chernykh || 3:2 || align=right | 32 km || 
|-id=395 bgcolor=#fefefe
| 7395 ||  || — || September 10, 1985 || Kleť || Z. Vávrová || FLO || align=right | 3.1 km || 
|-id=396 bgcolor=#d6d6d6
| 7396 Brusin ||  ||  || March 4, 1986 || La Silla || W. Ferreri || KOR || align=right | 7.6 km || 
|-id=397 bgcolor=#E9E9E9
| 7397 || 1986 QS || — || August 26, 1986 || La Silla || H. Debehogne || GEF || align=right | 7.2 km || 
|-id=398 bgcolor=#fefefe
| 7398 Walsh || 1986 VM ||  || November 3, 1986 || Kleť || A. Mrkos || — || align=right | 3.4 km || 
|-id=399 bgcolor=#fefefe
| 7399 Somme ||  ||  || January 29, 1987 || La Silla || E. W. Elst || — || align=right | 4.7 km || 
|-id=400 bgcolor=#d6d6d6
| 7400 Lenau ||  ||  || August 21, 1987 || La Silla || E. W. Elst || — || align=right | 6.3 km || 
|}

7401–7500 

|-bgcolor=#fefefe
| 7401 Toynbee ||  ||  || August 21, 1987 || La Silla || E. W. Elst || NYS || align=right | 7.8 km || 
|-id=402 bgcolor=#E9E9E9
| 7402 || 1987 YH || — || December 25, 1987 || Chiyoda || T. Kojima || DOR || align=right | 13 km || 
|-id=403 bgcolor=#E9E9E9
| 7403 Choustník ||  ||  || January 14, 1988 || Kleť || A. Mrkos || — || align=right | 8.0 km || 
|-id=404 bgcolor=#E9E9E9
| 7404 ||  || — || January 13, 1988 || La Silla || H. Debehogne || — || align=right | 11 km || 
|-id=405 bgcolor=#E9E9E9
| 7405 || 1988 FF || — || March 16, 1988 || Kushiro || S. Ueda, H. Kaneda || DOR || align=right | 14 km || 
|-id=406 bgcolor=#fefefe
| 7406 || 1988 TD || — || October 3, 1988 || Kushiro || S. Ueda, H. Kaneda || NYS || align=right | 7.2 km || 
|-id=407 bgcolor=#fefefe
| 7407 || 1988 TL || — || October 3, 1988 || Kushiro || S. Ueda, H. Kaneda || NYS || align=right | 3.4 km || 
|-id=408 bgcolor=#fefefe
| 7408 Yoshihide || 1989 SB ||  || September 23, 1989 || Kani || Y. Mizuno, T. Furuta || — || align=right | 4.3 km || 
|-id=409 bgcolor=#fefefe
| 7409 || 1990 BS || — || January 21, 1990 || Yorii || M. Arai, H. Mori || NYS || align=right | 4.3 km || 
|-id=410 bgcolor=#d6d6d6
| 7410 Kawazoe || 1990 QG ||  || August 20, 1990 || Geisei || T. Seki || — || align=right | 12 km || 
|-id=411 bgcolor=#d6d6d6
| 7411 ||  || — || August 22, 1990 || Palomar || H. E. Holt || TIR || align=right | 19 km || 
|-id=412 bgcolor=#d6d6d6
| 7412 Linnaeus ||  ||  || September 22, 1990 || La Silla || E. W. Elst || THM || align=right | 12 km || 
|-id=413 bgcolor=#d6d6d6
| 7413 Galibina ||  ||  || September 24, 1990 || Nauchnij || L. V. Zhuravleva, G. R. Kastelʹ || THM || align=right | 12 km || 
|-id=414 bgcolor=#d6d6d6
| 7414 Bosch ||  ||  || October 13, 1990 || Tautenburg Observatory || L. D. Schmadel, F. Börngen || — || align=right | 11 km || 
|-id=415 bgcolor=#d6d6d6
| 7415 Susumuimoto ||  ||  || November 14, 1990 || Geisei || T. Seki || THM || align=right | 13 km || 
|-id=416 bgcolor=#fefefe
| 7416 Linnankoski ||  ||  || November 16, 1990 || La Silla || E. W. Elst || — || align=right | 2.5 km || 
|-id=417 bgcolor=#d6d6d6
| 7417 || 1990 YE || — || December 19, 1990 || Yorii || M. Arai, H. Mori || — || align=right | 12 km || 
|-id=418 bgcolor=#fefefe
| 7418 Akasegawa ||  ||  || March 11, 1991 || Kitami || T. Fujii, K. Watanabe || V || align=right | 3.8 km || 
|-id=419 bgcolor=#E9E9E9
| 7419 ||  || — || August 5, 1991 || Palomar || H. E. Holt || EUN || align=right | 8.7 km || 
|-id=420 bgcolor=#fefefe
| 7420 Buffon ||  ||  || September 4, 1991 || La Silla || E. W. Elst || — || align=right | 6.3 km || 
|-id=421 bgcolor=#E9E9E9
| 7421 Kusaka || 1992 HL ||  || April 30, 1992 || Yatsugatake || Y. Kushida, O. Muramatsu || — || align=right | 5.7 km || 
|-id=422 bgcolor=#fefefe
| 7422 || 1992 LP || — || June 3, 1992 || Palomar || G. J. Leonard || — || align=right | 4.1 km || 
|-id=423 bgcolor=#fefefe
| 7423 ||  || — || August 2, 1992 || Palomar || H. E. Holt || FLO || align=right | 3.9 km || 
|-id=424 bgcolor=#fefefe
| 7424 ||  || — || August 6, 1992 || Palomar || H. E. Holt || V || align=right | 4.1 km || 
|-id=425 bgcolor=#fefefe
| 7425 Lessing ||  ||  || September 2, 1992 || La Silla || E. W. Elst || NYS || align=right | 3.6 km || 
|-id=426 bgcolor=#fefefe
| 7426 ||  || — || October 27, 1992 || Dynic || A. Sugie || NYS || align=right | 5.7 km || 
|-id=427 bgcolor=#E9E9E9
| 7427 || 1992 VD || — || November 2, 1992 || Uenohara || N. Kawasato || — || align=right | 6.1 km || 
|-id=428 bgcolor=#E9E9E9
| 7428 Abekuniomi || 1992 YM ||  || December 24, 1992 || Oohira || T. Urata || EUN || align=right | 5.2 km || 
|-id=429 bgcolor=#d6d6d6
| 7429 Hoshikawa ||  ||  || December 24, 1992 || Okutama || T. Hioki, S. Hayakawa || — || align=right | 7.8 km || 
|-id=430 bgcolor=#E9E9E9
| 7430 Kogure ||  ||  || January 23, 1993 || Kitami || K. Endate, K. Watanabe || slow || align=right | 8.1 km || 
|-id=431 bgcolor=#d6d6d6
| 7431 Jettaguilar ||  ||  || March 19, 1993 || La Silla || UESAC || — || align=right | 7.8 km || 
|-id=432 bgcolor=#d6d6d6
| 7432 ||  || — || April 23, 1993 || Lake Tekapo || A. C. Gilmore, P. M. Kilmartin || THM || align=right | 12 km || 
|-id=433 bgcolor=#fefefe
| 7433 Pellegrini || 1993 KD ||  || May 21, 1993 || Farra d'Isonzo || Farra d'Isonzo || — || align=right | 3.5 km || 
|-id=434 bgcolor=#fefefe
| 7434 Osaka ||  ||  || January 14, 1994 || Oizumi || T. Kobayashi || — || align=right | 4.7 km || 
|-id=435 bgcolor=#fefefe
| 7435 Sagamihara ||  ||  || February 8, 1994 || Kitami || K. Endate, K. Watanabe || FLO || align=right | 4.8 km || 
|-id=436 bgcolor=#fefefe
| 7436 Kuroiwa ||  ||  || February 8, 1994 || Kitami || K. Endate, K. Watanabe || — || align=right | 4.6 km || 
|-id=437 bgcolor=#fefefe
| 7437 Torricelli ||  ||  || March 12, 1994 || Cima Ekar || V. Goretti, A. Boattini || — || align=right | 3.5 km || 
|-id=438 bgcolor=#fefefe
| 7438 Misakatouge ||  ||  || May 12, 1994 || Kuma Kogen || A. Nakamura || — || align=right | 3.3 km || 
|-id=439 bgcolor=#E9E9E9
| 7439 Tetsufuse ||  ||  || December 6, 1994 || Oizumi || T. Kobayashi || — || align=right | 5.7 km || 
|-id=440 bgcolor=#E9E9E9
| 7440 Závist || 1995 EA ||  || March 1, 1995 || Kleť || M. Tichý || — || align=right | 5.1 km || 
|-id=441 bgcolor=#fefefe
| 7441 Láska || 1995 OZ ||  || July 30, 1995 || Kleť || J. Tichá, M. Tichý || — || align=right | 3.1 km || 
|-id=442 bgcolor=#d6d6d6
| 7442 Inouehideo ||  ||  || September 20, 1995 || Kitami || K. Endate, K. Watanabe || THM || align=right | 11 km || 
|-id=443 bgcolor=#d6d6d6
| 7443 Tsumura ||  ||  || January 26, 1996 || Oizumi || T. Kobayashi || KOR || align=right | 6.9 km || 
|-id=444 bgcolor=#E9E9E9
| 7444 ||  || — || October 9, 1996 || Kushiro || S. Ueda, H. Kaneda || GEF || align=right | 6.3 km || 
|-id=445 bgcolor=#FA8072
| 7445 Trajanus || 4116 P-L ||  || September 24, 1960 || Palomar || PLS || — || align=right | 3.2 km || 
|-id=446 bgcolor=#d6d6d6
| 7446 Hadrianus || 2249 T-2 ||  || September 29, 1973 || Palomar || PLS || — || align=right | 17 km || 
|-id=447 bgcolor=#fefefe
| 7447 Marcusaurelius || 1142 T-3 ||  || October 17, 1977 || Palomar || PLS || — || align=right | 5.0 km || 
|-id=448 bgcolor=#fefefe
| 7448 Pöllath || 1948 AA ||  || January 14, 1948 || Mount Wilson || W. Baade || — || align=right | 3.8 km || 
|-id=449 bgcolor=#fefefe
| 7449 Döllen || 1949 QL ||  || August 21, 1949 || Heidelberg || K. Reinmuth || FLO || align=right | 3.4 km || 
|-id=450 bgcolor=#E9E9E9
| 7450 Shilling || 1968 OZ ||  || July 24, 1968 || Cerro El Roble || G. A. Plyugin, Yu. A. Belyaev || — || align=right | 14 km || 
|-id=451 bgcolor=#E9E9E9
| 7451 Verbitskaya ||  ||  || August 8, 1978 || Nauchnij || N. S. Chernykh || GEF || align=right | 7.6 km || 
|-id=452 bgcolor=#d6d6d6
| 7452 Izabelyuria ||  ||  || August 31, 1978 || Nauchnij || N. S. Chernykh || THM || align=right | 10 km || 
|-id=453 bgcolor=#fefefe
| 7453 Slovtsov ||  ||  || September 5, 1978 || Nauchnij || N. S. Chernykh || — || align=right | 5.2 km || 
|-id=454 bgcolor=#d6d6d6
| 7454 Kevinrighter ||  ||  || March 2, 1981 || Siding Spring || S. J. Bus || THM || align=right | 12 km || 
|-id=455 bgcolor=#d6d6d6
| 7455 Podosek ||  ||  || March 2, 1981 || Siding Spring || S. J. Bus || KOR || align=right | 4.8 km || 
|-id=456 bgcolor=#E9E9E9
| 7456 Doressoundiram || 1982 OD ||  || July 17, 1982 || Anderson Mesa || E. Bowell || — || align=right | 8.6 km || 
|-id=457 bgcolor=#E9E9E9
| 7457 Veselov ||  ||  || September 16, 1982 || Nauchnij || L. I. Chernykh || PAD || align=right | 11 km || 
|-id=458 bgcolor=#d6d6d6
| 7458 ||  || — || February 28, 1984 || La Silla || H. Debehogne || 3:2 || align=right | 25 km || 
|-id=459 bgcolor=#E9E9E9
| 7459 Gilbertofranco ||  ||  || April 28, 1984 || La Silla || V. Zappalà || — || align=right | 5.4 km || 
|-id=460 bgcolor=#fefefe
| 7460 Julienicoles || 1984 JN ||  || May 9, 1984 || Palomar || J. Gibson || NYS || align=right | 4.4 km || 
|-id=461 bgcolor=#d6d6d6
| 7461 Kachmokiam || 1984 TD ||  || October 3, 1984 || Harvard Observatory || Oak Ridge Observatory || THM || align=right | 12 km || 
|-id=462 bgcolor=#fefefe
| 7462 Grenoble ||  ||  || November 20, 1984 || Anderson Mesa || E. Bowell || FLO || align=right | 5.3 km || 
|-id=463 bgcolor=#fefefe
| 7463 Oukawamine || 1985 SB ||  || September 20, 1985 || Geisei || T. Seki || — || align=right | 6.1 km || 
|-id=464 bgcolor=#E9E9E9
| 7464 Vipera ||  ||  || November 15, 1987 || Kleť || A. Mrkos || — || align=right | 3.7 km || 
|-id=465 bgcolor=#fefefe
| 7465 Munkanber ||  ||  || October 31, 1989 || Stakenbridge || B. G. W. Manning || NYS || align=right | 2.1 km || 
|-id=466 bgcolor=#d6d6d6
| 7466 ||  || — || November 2, 1989 || Okutama || T. Hioki, N. Kawasato || 7:4 || align=right | 24 km || 
|-id=467 bgcolor=#FA8072
| 7467 ||  || — || November 25, 1989 || Kushiro || S. Ueda, H. Kaneda || — || align=right | 1.9 km || 
|-id=468 bgcolor=#d6d6d6
| 7468 Anfimov ||  ||  || October 17, 1990 || Nauchnij || L. I. Chernykh || ANF || align=right | 10 km || 
|-id=469 bgcolor=#d6d6d6
| 7469 Krikalev ||  ||  || November 15, 1990 || Nauchnij || L. I. Chernykh || — || align=right | 13 km || 
|-id=470 bgcolor=#fefefe
| 7470 Jabberwock || 1991 JA ||  || May 2, 1991 || Oohira || T. Urata || V || align=right | 3.1 km || 
|-id=471 bgcolor=#fefefe
| 7471 || 1991 YD || — || December 28, 1991 || Uenohara || N. Kawasato || — || align=right | 6.0 km || 
|-id=472 bgcolor=#d6d6d6
| 7472 Kumakiri || 1992 CU ||  || February 13, 1992 || Susono || M. Akiyama, T. Furuta || — || align=right | 10 km || 
|-id=473 bgcolor=#d6d6d6
| 7473 ||  || — || March 1, 1992 || La Silla || UESAC || KOR || align=right | 6.6 km || 
|-id=474 bgcolor=#FFC2E0
| 7474 || 1992 TC || — || October 1, 1992 || Siding Spring || R. H. McNaught || AMO +1km || align=right data-sort-value="0.89" | 890 m || 
|-id=475 bgcolor=#fefefe
| 7475 Kaizuka ||  ||  || October 28, 1992 || Kitami || K. Endate, K. Watanabe || FLO || align=right | 4.2 km || 
|-id=476 bgcolor=#d6d6d6
| 7476 Ogilsbie || 1993 GE ||  || April 14, 1993 || Catalina || T. B. Spahr || — || align=right | 18 km || 
|-id=477 bgcolor=#E9E9E9
| 7477 || 1993 LC || — || June 13, 1993 || Palomar || H. E. Holt || EUN || align=right | 6.8 km || 
|-id=478 bgcolor=#d6d6d6
| 7478 Hasse ||  ||  || July 20, 1993 || La Silla || E. W. Elst || KOR || align=right | 4.5 km || 
|-id=479 bgcolor=#fefefe
| 7479 ||  || — || March 4, 1994 || Kushiro || S. Ueda, H. Kaneda || FLO || align=right | 4.0 km || 
|-id=480 bgcolor=#FFC2E0
| 7480 Norwan || 1994 PC ||  || August 1, 1994 || Palomar || C. S. Shoemaker, E. M. Shoemaker || AMO +1km || align=right | 1.4 km || 
|-id=481 bgcolor=#d6d6d6
| 7481 San Marcello ||  ||  || August 11, 1994 || San Marcello || A. Boattini, M. Tombelli || SANfast? || align=right | 11 km || 
|-id=482 bgcolor=#FFC2E0
| 7482 ||  || — || August 9, 1994 || Siding Spring || R. H. McNaught || APO +1kmPHA || align=right | 1.1 km || 
|-id=483 bgcolor=#d6d6d6
| 7483 Sekitakakazu ||  ||  || November 1, 1994 || Kitami || K. Endate, K. Watanabe || — || align=right | 18 km || 
|-id=484 bgcolor=#fefefe
| 7484 Dogo Onsen ||  ||  || November 30, 1994 || Kuma Kogen || A. Nakamura || — || align=right | 4.0 km || 
|-id=485 bgcolor=#d6d6d6
| 7485 Changchun || 1994 XO ||  || December 4, 1994 || Ayashi Station || M. Koishikawa || ITH || align=right | 11 km || 
|-id=486 bgcolor=#fefefe
| 7486 Hamabe ||  ||  || December 6, 1994 || Oizumi || T. Kobayashi || — || align=right | 3.3 km || 
|-id=487 bgcolor=#E9E9E9
| 7487 Toshitanaka || 1994 YM ||  || December 28, 1994 || Oizumi || T. Kobayashi || EUN || align=right | 8.1 km || 
|-id=488 bgcolor=#fefefe
| 7488 Robertpaul ||  ||  || May 27, 1995 || Catalina Station || C. W. Hergenrother || H || align=right | 2.7 km || 
|-id=489 bgcolor=#E9E9E9
| 7489 Oribe || 1995 MX ||  || June 26, 1995 || Catalina Station || C. W. Hergenrother || POSslow || align=right | 10 km || 
|-id=490 bgcolor=#fefefe
| 7490 Babička ||  ||  || July 31, 1995 || Ondřejov || P. Pravec || — || align=right | 2.4 km || 
|-id=491 bgcolor=#E9E9E9
| 7491 Linzerag ||  ||  || September 23, 1995 || Bologna || San Vittore Obs. || — || align=right | 13 km || 
|-id=492 bgcolor=#fefefe
| 7492 Kačenka || 1995 UX ||  || October 21, 1995 || Ondřejov || P. Pravec || NYS || align=right | 3.3 km || 
|-id=493 bgcolor=#E9E9E9
| 7493 Hirzo ||  ||  || October 24, 1995 || Kleť || J. Tichá || — || align=right | 5.8 km || 
|-id=494 bgcolor=#d6d6d6
| 7494 Xiwanggongcheng ||  ||  || October 28, 1995 || Xinglong || SCAP || — || align=right | 18 km || 
|-id=495 bgcolor=#E9E9E9
| 7495 Feynman ||  ||  || November 22, 1995 || Kleť || M. Tichý, Z. Moravec || — || align=right | 7.1 km || 
|-id=496 bgcolor=#d6d6d6
| 7496 Miroslavholub ||  ||  || November 27, 1995 || Kleť || M. Tichý || — || align=right | 21 km || 
|-id=497 bgcolor=#fefefe
| 7497 Guangcaishiye ||  ||  || December 17, 1995 || Xinglong || SCAP || NYS || align=right | 5.0 km || 
|-id=498 bgcolor=#d6d6d6
| 7498 Blaník || 1996 BF ||  || January 16, 1996 || Kleť || Z. Moravec || ALA || align=right | 17 km || 
|-id=499 bgcolor=#d6d6d6
| 7499 L'Aquila ||  ||  || July 24, 1996 || Campo Imperatore || A. Boattini, A. Di Paola || — || align=right | 12 km || 
|-id=500 bgcolor=#fefefe
| 7500 Sassi || 1996 TN ||  || October 3, 1996 || Farra d'Isonzo || Farra d'Isonzo || — || align=right | 5.1 km || 
|}

7501–7600 

|-bgcolor=#d6d6d6
| 7501 Farra ||  ||  || November 9, 1996 || Farra d'Isonzo || Farra d'Isonzo || 7:4 || align=right | 20 km || 
|-id=502 bgcolor=#d6d6d6
| 7502 Arakida ||  ||  || November 15, 1996 || Nachi-Katsuura || Y. Shimizu, T. Urata || KOR || align=right | 6.9 km || 
|-id=503 bgcolor=#fefefe
| 7503 ||  || — || November 7, 1996 || Kushiro || S. Ueda, H. Kaneda || — || align=right | 3.4 km || 
|-id=504 bgcolor=#d6d6d6
| 7504 Kawakita ||  ||  || January 2, 1997 || Oizumi || T. Kobayashi || — || align=right | 10 km || 
|-id=505 bgcolor=#FA8072
| 7505 Furusho ||  ||  || January 3, 1997 || Oizumi || T. Kobayashi || — || align=right | 9.1 km || 
|-id=506 bgcolor=#d6d6d6
| 7506 Lub || 4837 P-L ||  || September 24, 1960 || Palomar || PLS || THM || align=right | 8.8 km || 
|-id=507 bgcolor=#fefefe
| 7507 Israel || 7063 P-L ||  || October 17, 1960 || Palomar || PLS || — || align=right | 3.6 km || 
|-id=508 bgcolor=#E9E9E9
| 7508 Icke || 2327 T-3 ||  || October 16, 1977 || Palomar || PLS || AGN || align=right | 4.2 km || 
|-id=509 bgcolor=#fefefe
| 7509 Gamzatov || 1977 EL ||  || March 9, 1977 || Nauchnij || N. S. Chernykh || FLOslow || align=right | 3.9 km || 
|-id=510 bgcolor=#fefefe
| 7510 ||  || — || October 27, 1978 || Palomar || C. M. Olmstead || V || align=right | 3.4 km || 
|-id=511 bgcolor=#d6d6d6
| 7511 Patcassen ||  ||  || March 2, 1981 || Siding Spring || S. J. Bus || THM || align=right | 7.3 km || 
|-id=512 bgcolor=#E9E9E9
| 7512 Monicalazzarin ||  ||  || February 15, 1983 || Anderson Mesa || E. Bowell || DOR || align=right | 14 km || 
|-id=513 bgcolor=#fefefe
| 7513 ||  || — || September 5, 1985 || La Silla || H. Debehogne || — || align=right | 2.4 km || 
|-id=514 bgcolor=#fefefe
| 7514 || 1986 ED || — || March 7, 1986 || Kobuchizawa || M. Inoue, O. Muramatsu, T. Urata || — || align=right | 7.3 km || 
|-id=515 bgcolor=#fefefe
| 7515 Marrucino ||  ||  || March 5, 1986 || La Silla || G. DeSanctis || — || align=right | 5.2 km || 
|-id=516 bgcolor=#fefefe
| 7516 Kranjc || 1987 MC ||  || June 18, 1987 || Bologna || San Vittore Obs. || — || align=right | 6.1 km || 
|-id=517 bgcolor=#fefefe
| 7517 Alisondoane || 1989 AD ||  || January 3, 1989 || Chiyoda || T. Kojima || — || align=right | 9.1 km || 
|-id=518 bgcolor=#E9E9E9
| 7518 || 1989 FG || — || March 29, 1989 || Toyota || K. Suzuki, T. Furuta || — || align=right | 6.2 km || 
|-id=519 bgcolor=#d6d6d6
| 7519 Paulcook ||  ||  || October 31, 1989 || Stakenbridge || B. G. W. Manning || THM || align=right | 10 km || 
|-id=520 bgcolor=#fefefe
| 7520 || 1990 BV || — || January 21, 1990 || Okutama || T. Hioki, S. Hayakawa || — || align=right | 9.9 km || 
|-id=521 bgcolor=#d6d6d6
| 7521 ||  || — || August 24, 1990 || Palomar || H. E. Holt || KOR || align=right | 7.6 km || 
|-id=522 bgcolor=#d6d6d6
| 7522 || 1991 AJ || — || January 9, 1991 || Yorii || M. Arai, H. Mori || — || align=right | 14 km || 
|-id=523 bgcolor=#E9E9E9
| 7523 ||  || — || August 8, 1991 || Palomar || H. E. Holt || — || align=right | 5.6 km || 
|-id=524 bgcolor=#fefefe
| 7524 ||  || — || September 14, 1991 || Palomar || H. E. Holt || — || align=right | 3.8 km || 
|-id=525 bgcolor=#fefefe
| 7525 Kiyohira || 1992 YE ||  || December 18, 1992 || Yakiimo || A. Natori, T. Urata || V || align=right | 3.4 km || 
|-id=526 bgcolor=#fefefe
| 7526 Ohtsuka || 1993 AA ||  || January 2, 1993 || Oohira || T. Urata || — || align=right | 7.7 km || 
|-id=527 bgcolor=#fefefe
| 7527 Marples || 1993 BJ ||  || January 20, 1993 || Oohira || T. Urata || FLO || align=right | 4.4 km || 
|-id=528 bgcolor=#d6d6d6
| 7528 Huskvarna ||  ||  || March 19, 1993 || La Silla || UESAC || KOR || align=right | 6.9 km || 
|-id=529 bgcolor=#fefefe
| 7529 Vagnozzi || 1994 BC ||  || January 16, 1994 || Colleverde || Colleverde Obs. || — || align=right | 4.9 km || 
|-id=530 bgcolor=#E9E9E9
| 7530 Mizusawa ||  ||  || April 15, 1994 || Kitami || K. Endate, K. Watanabe || — || align=right | 8.0 km || 
|-id=531 bgcolor=#fefefe
| 7531 Pecorelli || 1994 SC ||  || September 24, 1994 || Stroncone || Santa Lucia Obs. || — || align=right | 4.4 km || 
|-id=532 bgcolor=#E9E9E9
| 7532 Pelhřimov ||  ||  || October 22, 1995 || Kleť || M. Tichý || — || align=right | 4.7 km || 
|-id=533 bgcolor=#d6d6d6
| 7533 Seiraiji ||  ||  || October 25, 1995 || Nachi-Katsuura || Y. Shimizu, T. Urata || — || align=right | 12 km || 
|-id=534 bgcolor=#fefefe
| 7534 ||  || — || October 26, 1995 || Nachi-Katsuura || Y. Shimizu, T. Urata || — || align=right | 5.2 km || 
|-id=535 bgcolor=#d6d6d6
| 7535 ||  || — || November 16, 1995 || Kushiro || S. Ueda, H. Kaneda || — || align=right | 15 km || 
|-id=536 bgcolor=#d6d6d6
| 7536 Fahrenheit ||  ||  || November 21, 1995 || Nachi-Katsuura || Y. Shimizu, T. Urata || — || align=right | 24 km || 
|-id=537 bgcolor=#d6d6d6
| 7537 Solvay ||  ||  || April 17, 1996 || La Silla || E. W. Elst || — || align=right | 10 km || 
|-id=538 bgcolor=#fefefe
| 7538 Zenbei ||  ||  || November 15, 1996 || Oizumi || T. Kobayashi || NYS || align=right | 4.1 km || 
|-id=539 bgcolor=#E9E9E9
| 7539 ||  || — || December 6, 1996 || Kushiro || S. Ueda, H. Kaneda || — || align=right | 4.9 km || 
|-id=540 bgcolor=#fefefe
| 7540 ||  || — || January 9, 1997 || Kushiro || S. Ueda, H. Kaneda || V || align=right | 5.7 km || 
|-id=541 bgcolor=#E9E9E9
| 7541 Nieuwenhuis || 4019 T-3 ||  || October 16, 1977 || Palomar || PLS || — || align=right | 5.9 km || 
|-id=542 bgcolor=#fefefe
| 7542 Johnpond || 1953 GN ||  || April 7, 1953 || Heidelberg || K. Reinmuth || — || align=right | 4.0 km || 
|-id=543 bgcolor=#C2FFFF
| 7543 Prylis || 1973 SY ||  || September 19, 1973 || Palomar || PLS || L4 || align=right | 43 km || 
|-id=544 bgcolor=#d6d6d6
| 7544 Tipografiyanauka ||  ||  || October 26, 1976 || Nauchnij || T. M. Smirnova || KOR || align=right | 8.3 km || 
|-id=545 bgcolor=#fefefe
| 7545 Smaklösa || 1978 OB ||  || July 28, 1978 || Mount Stromlo || C.-I. Lagerkvist || — || align=right | 4.1 km || 
|-id=546 bgcolor=#fefefe
| 7546 Meriam ||  ||  || June 25, 1979 || Siding Spring || E. F. Helin, S. J. Bus || FLO || align=right | 2.0 km || 
|-id=547 bgcolor=#d6d6d6
| 7547 Martinnakata ||  ||  || June 25, 1979 || Siding Spring || E. F. Helin, S. J. Bus || KOR || align=right | 3.3 km || 
|-id=548 bgcolor=#d6d6d6
| 7548 Engström ||  ||  || March 16, 1980 || La Silla || C.-I. Lagerkvist || THM || align=right | 11 km || 
|-id=549 bgcolor=#d6d6d6
| 7549 Woodard ||  ||  || October 9, 1980 || Palomar || C. S. Shoemaker, E. M. Shoemaker || EOS || align=right | 8.8 km || 
|-id=550 bgcolor=#fefefe
| 7550 Woolum ||  ||  || March 1, 1981 || Siding Spring || S. J. Bus || FLO || align=right | 3.1 km || 
|-id=551 bgcolor=#d6d6d6
| 7551 Edstolper ||  ||  || March 2, 1981 || Siding Spring || S. J. Bus || — || align=right | 20 km || 
|-id=552 bgcolor=#E9E9E9
| 7552 Sephton ||  ||  || March 2, 1981 || Siding Spring || S. J. Bus || — || align=right | 2.4 km || 
|-id=553 bgcolor=#fefefe
| 7553 Buie || 1981 FG ||  || March 30, 1981 || Anderson Mesa || E. Bowell || NYS || align=right | 3.4 km || 
|-id=554 bgcolor=#d6d6d6
| 7554 Johnspencer || 1981 GQ ||  || April 5, 1981 || Anderson Mesa || E. Bowell || — || align=right | 16 km || 
|-id=555 bgcolor=#fefefe
| 7555 Venvolkov ||  ||  || September 28, 1981 || Nauchnij || L. V. Zhuravleva || — || align=right | 3.2 km || 
|-id=556 bgcolor=#d6d6d6
| 7556 Perinaldo ||  ||  || March 18, 1982 || La Silla || H. Debehogne || — || align=right | 9.6 km || 
|-id=557 bgcolor=#fefefe
| 7557 ||  || — || March 21, 1982 || La Silla || H. Debehogne || — || align=right | 7.7 km || 
|-id=558 bgcolor=#fefefe
| 7558 Yurlov ||  ||  || October 14, 1982 || Nauchnij || L. G. Karachkina || — || align=right | 6.0 km || 
|-id=559 bgcolor=#fefefe
| 7559 Kirstinemeyer || 1985 VF ||  || November 14, 1985 || Brorfelde || P. Jensen || — || align=right | 7.1 km || 
|-id=560 bgcolor=#fefefe
| 7560 Spudis || 1986 AJ ||  || January 10, 1986 || Palomar || C. S. Shoemaker, E. M. Shoemaker || H || align=right | 3.2 km || 
|-id=561 bgcolor=#E9E9E9
| 7561 Patrickmichel ||  ||  || October 7, 1986 || Anderson Mesa || E. Bowell || — || align=right | 15 km || 
|-id=562 bgcolor=#E9E9E9
| 7562 Kagiroino-Oka ||  ||  || November 30, 1986 || Kiso || H. Kosai, K. Furukawa || — || align=right | 6.9 km || 
|-id=563 bgcolor=#E9E9E9
| 7563 || 1988 BC || — || January 16, 1988 || Chiyoda || T. Kojima || — || align=right | 16 km || 
|-id=564 bgcolor=#E9E9E9
| 7564 Gokumenon || 1988 CA ||  || February 7, 1988 || Kavalur || R. Rajamohan || — || align=right | 8.5 km || 
|-id=565 bgcolor=#d6d6d6
| 7565 Zipfel ||  ||  || September 14, 1988 || Cerro Tololo || S. J. Bus || — || align=right | 14 km || 
|-id=566 bgcolor=#fefefe
| 7566 || 1988 SP || — || September 18, 1988 || La Silla || H. Debehogne || — || align=right | 3.5 km || 
|-id=567 bgcolor=#fefefe
| 7567 ||  || — || October 13, 1988 || Kushiro || S. Ueda, H. Kaneda || FLO || align=right | 3.4 km || 
|-id=568 bgcolor=#E9E9E9
| 7568 ||  || — || November 7, 1988 || Okutama || T. Hioki, N. Kawasato || — || align=right | 2.6 km || 
|-id=569 bgcolor=#E9E9E9
| 7569 || 1989 BK || — || January 28, 1989 || Gekko || Y. Oshima || — || align=right | 7.1 km || 
|-id=570 bgcolor=#fefefe
| 7570 || 1989 CP || — || February 5, 1989 || Yorii || M. Arai, H. Mori || NYS || align=right | 4.9 km || 
|-id=571 bgcolor=#d6d6d6
| 7571 Weisse Rose ||  ||  || March 7, 1989 || Tautenburg Observatory || F. Börngen || THM || align=right | 15 km || 
|-id=572 bgcolor=#fefefe
| 7572 Znokai || 1989 SF ||  || September 23, 1989 || Kitami || K. Endate, K. Watanabe || — || align=right | 4.7 km || 
|-id=573 bgcolor=#d6d6d6
| 7573 Basfifty || 1989 VX ||  || November 4, 1989 || Stakenbridge || B. G. W. Manning || THM || align=right | 10 km || 
|-id=574 bgcolor=#d6d6d6
| 7574 ||  || — || November 20, 1989 || Oohira || W. Kakei, M. Kizawa, T. Urata || 7:4 || align=right | 24 km || 
|-id=575 bgcolor=#fefefe
| 7575 Kimuraseiji || 1989 YK ||  || December 22, 1989 || Yatsugatake || Y. Kushida, O. Muramatsu || NYS || align=right | 4.4 km || 
|-id=576 bgcolor=#E9E9E9
| 7576 || 1990 BN || — || January 21, 1990 || Yorii || M. Arai, H. Mori || GEF || align=right | 6.9 km || 
|-id=577 bgcolor=#d6d6d6
| 7577 ||  || — || August 24, 1990 || Palomar || H. E. Holt || EOS || align=right | 9.8 km || 
|-id=578 bgcolor=#E9E9E9
| 7578 Georgböhm ||  ||  || September 22, 1990 || La Silla || E. W. Elst || — || align=right | 14 km || 
|-id=579 bgcolor=#fefefe
| 7579 ||  || — || October 14, 1990 || Palomar || E. F. Helin || H || align=right | 3.5 km || 
|-id=580 bgcolor=#E9E9E9
| 7580 Schwabhausen ||  ||  || October 13, 1990 || Tautenburg Observatory || F. Börngen, L. D. Schmadel || — || align=right | 6.3 km || 
|-id=581 bgcolor=#d6d6d6
| 7581 Yudovich ||  ||  || November 14, 1990 || Nauchnij || L. G. Karachkina || — || align=right | 16 km || 
|-id=582 bgcolor=#d6d6d6
| 7582 || 1990 WL || — || November 20, 1990 || Siding Spring || R. H. McNaught || — || align=right | 13 km || 
|-id=583 bgcolor=#d6d6d6
| 7583 Rosegger ||  ||  || January 17, 1991 || Tautenburg Observatory || F. Börngen || EOS || align=right | 8.8 km || 
|-id=584 bgcolor=#d6d6d6
| 7584 Ossietzky ||  ||  || April 9, 1991 || Tautenburg Observatory || F. Börngen || — || align=right | 6.0 km || 
|-id=585 bgcolor=#d6d6d6
| 7585 ||  || — || August 5, 1991 || Palomar || H. E. Holt || — || align=right | 16 km || 
|-id=586 bgcolor=#E9E9E9
| 7586 Bismarck ||  ||  || September 13, 1991 || Tautenburg Observatory || L. D. Schmadel, F. Börngen || DOR || align=right | 12 km || 
|-id=587 bgcolor=#fefefe
| 7587 Weckmann ||  ||  || February 2, 1992 || La Silla || E. W. Elst || FLO || align=right | 3.7 km || 
|-id=588 bgcolor=#d6d6d6
| 7588 ||  || — || March 24, 1992 || Siding Spring || R. H. McNaught || ALA || align=right | 37 km || 
|-id=589 bgcolor=#fefefe
| 7589 ||  || — || September 26, 1992 || Dynic || A. Sugie || FLO || align=right | 3.2 km || 
|-id=590 bgcolor=#fefefe
| 7590 Aterui ||  ||  || October 26, 1992 || Kitami || K. Endate, K. Watanabe || FLO || align=right | 4.2 km || 
|-id=591 bgcolor=#fefefe
| 7591 ||  || — || November 18, 1992 || Kushiro || S. Ueda, H. Kaneda || NYS || align=right | 2.7 km || 
|-id=592 bgcolor=#E9E9E9
| 7592 Takinemachi ||  ||  || November 23, 1992 || Kiyosato || S. Otomo || EUN || align=right | 8.6 km || 
|-id=593 bgcolor=#E9E9E9
| 7593 Cernuschi ||  ||  || November 21, 1992 || Palomar || E. F. Helin || — || align=right | 8.6 km || 
|-id=594 bgcolor=#fefefe
| 7594 Shotaro ||  ||  || January 19, 1993 || Geisei || T. Seki || NYS || align=right | 4.6 km || 
|-id=595 bgcolor=#E9E9E9
| 7595 Växjö ||  ||  || March 21, 1993 || La Silla || UESAC || HNA || align=right | 16 km || 
|-id=596 bgcolor=#d6d6d6
| 7596 Yumi || 1993 GH ||  || April 10, 1993 || Kitami || K. Endate, K. Watanabe || EOS || align=right | 13 km || 
|-id=597 bgcolor=#d6d6d6
| 7597 Shigemi || 1993 GM ||  || April 14, 1993 || Kiyosato || S. Otomo || KOR || align=right | 9.1 km || 
|-id=598 bgcolor=#d6d6d6
| 7598 || 1994 CS || — || February 4, 1994 || Kushiro || S. Ueda, H. Kaneda || — || align=right | 9.2 km || 
|-id=599 bgcolor=#d6d6d6
| 7599 Munari || 1994 PB ||  || August 3, 1994 || San Marcello || A. Boattini, M. Tombelli || — || align=right | 8.8 km || 
|-id=600 bgcolor=#E9E9E9
| 7600 Vacchi ||  ||  || September 9, 1994 || Colleverde || V. S. Casulli || — || align=right | 9.1 km || 
|}

7601–7700 

|-bgcolor=#E9E9E9
| 7601 ||  || — || October 25, 1994 || Kushiro || S. Ueda, H. Kaneda || MAR || align=right | 7.3 km || 
|-id=602 bgcolor=#d6d6d6
| 7602 Yidaeam ||  ||  || December 31, 1994 || Oizumi || T. Kobayashi || EOS || align=right | 9.6 km || 
|-id=603 bgcolor=#d6d6d6
| 7603 Salopia ||  ||  || July 25, 1995 || Church Stretton || S. P. Laurie || EOSfast? || align=right | 8.4 km || 
|-id=604 bgcolor=#FA8072
| 7604 Kridsadaporn ||  ||  || August 31, 1995 || Siding Spring || R. H. McNaught || unusual || align=right | 12 km || 
|-id=605 bgcolor=#d6d6d6
| 7605 Cindygraber ||  ||  || September 21, 1995 || Catalina Station || T. B. Spahr || — || align=right | 38 km || 
|-id=606 bgcolor=#fefefe
| 7606 ||  || — || September 20, 1995 || Kushiro || S. Ueda, H. Kaneda || NYS || align=right | 3.0 km || 
|-id=607 bgcolor=#E9E9E9
| 7607 Billmerline ||  ||  || September 18, 1995 || Kitt Peak || Spacewatch || HOF || align=right | 12 km || 
|-id=608 bgcolor=#fefefe
| 7608 Telegramia ||  ||  || October 22, 1995 || Kleť || J. Tichá || NYS || align=right | 4.0 km || 
|-id=609 bgcolor=#E9E9E9
| 7609 ||  || — || November 18, 1995 || Nachi-Katsuura || Y. Shimizu, T. Urata || — || align=right | 6.9 km || 
|-id=610 bgcolor=#d6d6d6
| 7610 Sudbury || 1995 XB ||  || December 3, 1995 || Sudbury || D. di Cicco || KOR || align=right | 6.7 km || 
|-id=611 bgcolor=#d6d6d6
| 7611 Hashitatsu ||  ||  || January 23, 1996 || Oizumi || T. Kobayashi || — || align=right | 24 km || 
|-id=612 bgcolor=#d6d6d6
| 7612 ||  || — || February 12, 1996 || Kushiro || S. Ueda, H. Kaneda || VER || align=right | 23 km || 
|-id=613 bgcolor=#d6d6d6
| 7613 ʻAkikiki || 1996 DK ||  || February 16, 1996 || Haleakalā || NEAT || — || align=right | 9.4 km || 
|-id=614 bgcolor=#fefefe
| 7614 Masatomi || 1996 EA ||  || March 2, 1996 || Oizumi || T. Kobayashi || — || align=right | 5.3 km || 
|-id=615 bgcolor=#fefefe
| 7615 ||  || — || October 9, 1996 || Kushiro || S. Ueda, H. Kaneda || NYS || align=right | 3.9 km || 
|-id=616 bgcolor=#d6d6d6
| 7616 Sadako ||  ||  || November 6, 1996 || Oizumi || T. Kobayashi || EOS || align=right | 12 km || 
|-id=617 bgcolor=#E9E9E9
| 7617 ||  || — || November 7, 1996 || Kushiro || S. Ueda, H. Kaneda || DOR || align=right | 12 km || 
|-id=618 bgcolor=#E9E9E9
| 7618 Gotoyukichi ||  ||  || January 6, 1997 || Oizumi || T. Kobayashi || — || align=right | 5.7 km || 
|-id=619 bgcolor=#fefefe
| 7619 ||  || — || January 13, 1997 || Nachi-Katsuura || Y. Shimizu, T. Urata || — || align=right | 2.4 km || 
|-id=620 bgcolor=#fefefe
| 7620 Willaert || 4077 P-L ||  || September 24, 1960 || Palomar || PLS || NYS || align=right | 2.1 km || 
|-id=621 bgcolor=#d6d6d6
| 7621 Sweelinck || 4127 P-L ||  || September 24, 1960 || Palomar || PLS || THM || align=right | 6.5 km || 
|-id=622 bgcolor=#fefefe
| 7622 Pergolesi || 6624 P-L ||  || September 24, 1960 || Palomar || PLS || — || align=right | 2.7 km || 
|-id=623 bgcolor=#d6d6d6
| 7623 Stamitz || 9508 P-L ||  || October 17, 1960 || Palomar || PLS || THM || align=right | 13 km || 
|-id=624 bgcolor=#d6d6d6
| 7624 Gluck || 1251 T-1 ||  || March 25, 1971 || Palomar || PLS || EOS || align=right | 8.3 km || 
|-id=625 bgcolor=#E9E9E9
| 7625 Louisspohr || 2150 T-2 ||  || September 29, 1973 || Palomar || PLS || — || align=right | 9.5 km || 
|-id=626 bgcolor=#d6d6d6
| 7626 Iafe ||  ||  || August 20, 1976 || El Leoncito || Félix Aguilar Obs. || VER || align=right | 17 km || 
|-id=627 bgcolor=#d6d6d6
| 7627 Wakenokiyomaro ||  ||  || February 18, 1977 || Kiso || H. Kosai, K. Furukawa || — || align=right | 6.2 km || 
|-id=628 bgcolor=#E9E9E9
| 7628 Evgenifedorov || 1977 QY ||  || August 19, 1977 || Nauchnij || N. S. Chernykh || EUN || align=right | 6.9 km || 
|-id=629 bgcolor=#fefefe
| 7629 Foros ||  ||  || August 19, 1977 || Nauchnij || N. S. Chernykh || NYS || align=right | 2.8 km || 
|-id=630 bgcolor=#d6d6d6
| 7630 Yidumduma ||  ||  || June 25, 1979 || Siding Spring || E. F. Helin, S. J. Bus || KOR || align=right | 6.4 km || 
|-id=631 bgcolor=#fefefe
| 7631 Vokrouhlický || 1981 WH ||  || November 20, 1981 || Anderson Mesa || E. Bowell || — || align=right | 3.8 km || 
|-id=632 bgcolor=#fefefe
| 7632 Stanislav ||  ||  || October 20, 1982 || Nauchnij || L. G. Karachkina || — || align=right | 4.6 km || 
|-id=633 bgcolor=#E9E9E9
| 7633 Volodymyr ||  ||  || October 21, 1982 || Nauchnij || L. G. Karachkina || RAF || align=right | 5.0 km || 
|-id=634 bgcolor=#d6d6d6
| 7634 Shizutani-Kou ||  ||  || November 14, 1982 || Kiso || H. Kosai, K. Furukawa || THM || align=right | 9.9 km || 
|-id=635 bgcolor=#d6d6d6
| 7635 Carolinesmith ||  ||  || November 6, 1983 || Kleť || A. Mrkos || EOS || align=right | 24 km || 
|-id=636 bgcolor=#E9E9E9
| 7636 Comba || 1984 CM ||  || February 5, 1984 || Anderson Mesa || E. Bowell || — || align=right | 11 km || 
|-id=637 bgcolor=#E9E9E9
| 7637 || 1984 DN || — || February 23, 1984 || La Silla || H. Debehogne || — || align=right | 6.0 km || 
|-id=638 bgcolor=#E9E9E9
| 7638 Gladman || 1984 UX ||  || October 26, 1984 || Anderson Mesa || E. Bowell || — || align=right | 5.8 km || 
|-id=639 bgcolor=#d6d6d6
| 7639 Offutt ||  ||  || February 21, 1985 || Harvard Observatory || Oak Ridge Observatory || THM || align=right | 12 km || 
|-id=640 bgcolor=#fefefe
| 7640 Marzari || 1985 PX ||  || August 14, 1985 || Anderson Mesa || E. Bowell || FLO || align=right | 3.1 km || 
|-id=641 bgcolor=#C2FFFF
| 7641 Cteatus ||  ||  || October 5, 1986 || Piwnice || M. Antal || L4 || align=right | 72 km || 
|-id=642 bgcolor=#fefefe
| 7642 || 1988 TZ || — || October 13, 1988 || Kushiro || S. Ueda, H. Kaneda || — || align=right | 2.5 km || 
|-id=643 bgcolor=#fefefe
| 7643 ||  || — || November 6, 1988 || Yorii || M. Arai, H. Mori || FLO || align=right | 2.9 km || 
|-id=644 bgcolor=#E9E9E9
| 7644 Cslewis ||  ||  || November 4, 1988 || Kleť || A. Mrkos || MAR || align=right | 5.8 km || 
|-id=645 bgcolor=#fefefe
| 7645 Pons ||  ||  || January 4, 1989 || Kleť || A. Mrkos || — || align=right | 4.1 km || 
|-id=646 bgcolor=#E9E9E9
| 7646 || 1989 KE || — || May 29, 1989 || Palomar || H. E. Holt || EUN || align=right | 4.8 km || 
|-id=647 bgcolor=#d6d6d6
| 7647 Etrépigny ||  ||  || September 26, 1989 || La Silla || E. W. Elst || KOR || align=right | 7.0 km || 
|-id=648 bgcolor=#fefefe
| 7648 Tomboles ||  ||  || October 8, 1989 || Kani || Y. Mizuno, T. Furuta || — || align=right | 3.9 km || 
|-id=649 bgcolor=#E9E9E9
| 7649 Bougainville ||  ||  || September 22, 1990 || La Silla || E. W. Elst || — || align=right | 4.7 km || 
|-id=650 bgcolor=#d6d6d6
| 7650 Kaname || 1990 UG ||  || October 16, 1990 || Geisei || T. Seki || NAE || align=right | 18 km || 
|-id=651 bgcolor=#E9E9E9
| 7651 Villeneuve ||  ||  || November 15, 1990 || La Silla || E. W. Elst || GEF || align=right | 6.5 km || 
|-id=652 bgcolor=#d6d6d6
| 7652 ||  || — || September 13, 1991 || Palomar || H. E. Holt || — || align=right | 10 km || 
|-id=653 bgcolor=#fefefe
| 7653 || 1991 UV || — || October 18, 1991 || Kushiro || S. Ueda, H. Kaneda || — || align=right | 5.2 km || 
|-id=654 bgcolor=#fefefe
| 7654 ||  || — || November 11, 1991 || Kushiro || S. Ueda, H. Kaneda || NYS || align=right | 3.2 km || 
|-id=655 bgcolor=#fefefe
| 7655 Adamries ||  ||  || December 28, 1991 || Tautenburg Observatory || F. Börngen || NYS || align=right | 4.1 km || 
|-id=656 bgcolor=#d6d6d6
| 7656 Joemontani || 1992 HX ||  || April 24, 1992 || Kitt Peak || Spacewatch || — || align=right | 9.2 km || 
|-id=657 bgcolor=#d6d6d6
| 7657 Jefflarsen ||  ||  || April 25, 1992 || Kitt Peak || Spacewatch || KOR || align=right | 6.6 km || 
|-id=658 bgcolor=#fefefe
| 7658 ||  || — || January 22, 1993 || Kushiro || S. Ueda, H. Kaneda || NYS || align=right | 4.9 km || 
|-id=659 bgcolor=#E9E9E9
| 7659 ||  || — || February 15, 1993 || Kushiro || S. Ueda, H. Kaneda || EUN || align=right | 5.8 km || 
|-id=660 bgcolor=#FA8072
| 7660 Alexanderwilson ||  ||  || November 5, 1993 || Siding Spring || R. H. McNaught || H || align=right | 3.2 km || 
|-id=661 bgcolor=#d6d6d6
| 7661 Reincken ||  ||  || August 10, 1994 || La Silla || E. W. Elst || KOR || align=right | 3.9 km || 
|-id=662 bgcolor=#d6d6d6
| 7662 ||  || — || September 3, 1994 || Nachi-Katsuura || Y. Shimizu, T. Urata || — || align=right | 20 km || 
|-id=663 bgcolor=#fefefe
| 7663 ||  || — || September 2, 1994 || Palomar || E. F. Helin || PHOslow || align=right | 5.5 km || 
|-id=664 bgcolor=#d6d6d6
| 7664 Namahage ||  ||  || October 2, 1994 || Kitami || K. Endate, K. Watanabe || KOR || align=right | 7.1 km || 
|-id=665 bgcolor=#d6d6d6
| 7665 Putignano ||  ||  || October 11, 1994 || Colleverde || V. S. Casulli || KOR || align=right | 6.5 km || 
|-id=666 bgcolor=#E9E9E9
| 7666 Keyaki ||  ||  || November 4, 1994 || Sendai || K. Cross || — || align=right | 5.2 km || 
|-id=667 bgcolor=#d6d6d6
| 7667 ||  || — || January 29, 1995 || Nachi-Katsuura || Y. Shimizu, T. Urata || EOS || align=right | 12 km || 
|-id=668 bgcolor=#fefefe
| 7668 Mizunotakao ||  ||  || January 31, 1995 || Oizumi || T. Kobayashi || NYS || align=right | 4.0 km || 
|-id=669 bgcolor=#E9E9E9
| 7669 Malše || 1995 PB ||  || August 4, 1995 || Kleť || M. Tichý, Z. Moravec || — || align=right | 4.7 km || 
|-id=670 bgcolor=#fefefe
| 7670 Kabeláč || 1995 QJ ||  || August 20, 1995 || Ondřejov || L. Kotková || NYS || align=right | 1.8 km || 
|-id=671 bgcolor=#fefefe
| 7671 Albis ||  ||  || October 22, 1995 || Kleť || Z. Moravec || — || align=right | 2.4 km || 
|-id=672 bgcolor=#fefefe
| 7672 Hawking ||  ||  || October 24, 1995 || Kleť || Kleť Obs. || — || align=right | 2.0 km || 
|-id=673 bgcolor=#fefefe
| 7673 Inohara ||  ||  || October 20, 1995 || Oizumi || T. Kobayashi || NYS || align=right | 3.5 km || 
|-id=674 bgcolor=#d6d6d6
| 7674 Kasuga ||  ||  || November 15, 1995 || Kitami || K. Endate, K. Watanabe || KOR || align=right | 9.5 km || 
|-id=675 bgcolor=#fefefe
| 7675 Gorizia ||  ||  || November 23, 1995 || Farra d'Isonzo || Farra d'Isonzo || — || align=right | 3.8 km || 
|-id=676 bgcolor=#fefefe
| 7676 ||  || — || November 18, 1995 || Nachi-Katsuura || Y. Shimizu, T. Urata || — || align=right | 6.2 km || 
|-id=677 bgcolor=#fefefe
| 7677 Sawa ||  ||  || December 27, 1995 || Oizumi || T. Kobayashi || — || align=right | 4.7 km || 
|-id=678 bgcolor=#d6d6d6
| 7678 Onoda ||  ||  || February 15, 1996 || Kuma Kogen || A. Nakamura || VER || align=right | 9.4 km || 
|-id=679 bgcolor=#E9E9E9
| 7679 Asiago ||  ||  || February 15, 1996 || Cima Ekar || U. Munari, M. Tombelli || — || align=right | 5.7 km || 
|-id=680 bgcolor=#E9E9E9
| 7680 Cari || 1996 HB ||  || April 16, 1996 || Stroncone || Santa Lucia Obs. || — || align=right | 11 km || 
|-id=681 bgcolor=#fefefe
| 7681 Chenjingrun ||  ||  || December 24, 1996 || Xinglong || SCAP || — || align=right | 9.0 km || 
|-id=682 bgcolor=#E9E9E9
| 7682 Miura ||  ||  || February 12, 1997 || Oizumi || T. Kobayashi || — || align=right | 4.4 km || 
|-id=683 bgcolor=#fefefe
| 7683 Wuwenjun || 1997 DE ||  || February 19, 1997 || Xinglong || SCAP || FLO || align=right | 5.8 km || 
|-id=684 bgcolor=#E9E9E9
| 7684 Marioferrero || 1997 EY ||  || March 3, 1997 || Prescott || P. G. Comba || AGN || align=right | 6.3 km || 
|-id=685 bgcolor=#fefefe
| 7685 ||  || — || March 1, 1997 || Kushiro || S. Ueda, H. Kaneda || FLO || align=right | 4.5 km || 
|-id=686 bgcolor=#fefefe
| 7686 Wolfernst || 2024 P-L ||  || September 24, 1960 || Palomar || PLS || FLO || align=right | 4.4 km || 
|-id=687 bgcolor=#fefefe
| 7687 Matthias || 2099 P-L ||  || September 24, 1960 || Palomar || PLS || FLO || align=right | 3.5 km || 
|-id=688 bgcolor=#fefefe
| 7688 Lothar || 2536 P-L ||  || September 24, 1960 || Palomar || PLS || V || align=right | 4.3 km || 
|-id=689 bgcolor=#d6d6d6
| 7689 Reinerstoss || 4036 P-L ||  || September 24, 1960 || Palomar || PLS || KOR || align=right | 4.4 km || 
|-id=690 bgcolor=#E9E9E9
| 7690 Sackler || 2291 T-1 ||  || March 25, 1971 || Palomar || PLS || — || align=right | 9.9 km || 
|-id=691 bgcolor=#fefefe
| 7691 Brady || 3186 T-3 ||  || October 16, 1977 || Palomar || PLS || NYS || align=right | 3.9 km || 
|-id=692 bgcolor=#d6d6d6
| 7692 Edhenderson ||  ||  || March 2, 1981 || Siding Spring || S. J. Bus || — || align=right | 12 km || 
|-id=693 bgcolor=#E9E9E9
| 7693 Hoshitakuhai || 1982 WE ||  || November 20, 1982 || Geisei || T. Seki || — || align=right | 5.8 km || 
|-id=694 bgcolor=#d6d6d6
| 7694 Krasetín || 1983 SF ||  || September 29, 1983 || Kleť || A. Mrkos || slow || align=right | 12 km || 
|-id=695 bgcolor=#fefefe
| 7695 Přemysl ||  ||  || November 27, 1984 || Kleť || A. Mrkos || — || align=right | 3.4 km || 
|-id=696 bgcolor=#E9E9E9
| 7696 Liebe || 1988 JD ||  || May 10, 1988 || La Silla || W. Landgraf || HEN || align=right | 5.0 km || 
|-id=697 bgcolor=#fefefe
| 7697 || 1989 AE || — || January 3, 1989 || Chiyoda || T. Kojima || — || align=right | 3.8 km || 
|-id=698 bgcolor=#fefefe
| 7698 Schweitzer ||  ||  || January 11, 1989 || Tautenburg Observatory || F. Börngen || NYS || align=right | 2.2 km || 
|-id=699 bgcolor=#fefefe
| 7699 Božek ||  ||  || February 2, 1989 || Kleť || A. Mrkos || — || align=right | 3.9 km || 
|-id=700 bgcolor=#E9E9E9
| 7700 Rote Kapelle ||  ||  || October 13, 1990 || Tautenburg Observatory || F. Börngen, L. D. Schmadel || — || align=right | 3.0 km || 
|}

7701–7800 

|-bgcolor=#E9E9E9
| 7701 Zrzavý ||  ||  || October 14, 1990 || Kleť || A. Mrkos || — || align=right | 4.9 km || 
|-id=702 bgcolor=#fefefe
| 7702 ||  || — || August 5, 1991 || Palomar || H. E. Holt || FLO || align=right | 3.0 km || 
|-id=703 bgcolor=#fefefe
| 7703 || 1991 RW || — || September 7, 1991 || Palomar || E. F. Helin || — || align=right | 7.2 km || 
|-id=704 bgcolor=#E9E9E9
| 7704 Dellen ||  ||  || March 1, 1992 || La Silla || UESAC || — || align=right | 4.8 km || 
|-id=705 bgcolor=#fefefe
| 7705 Humeln ||  ||  || March 17, 1993 || La Silla || UESAC || NYS || align=right | 2.2 km || 
|-id=706 bgcolor=#fefefe
| 7706 Mien ||  ||  || March 19, 1993 || La Silla || UESAC || NYS || align=right | 3.1 km || 
|-id=707 bgcolor=#E9E9E9
| 7707 Yes ||  ||  || April 17, 1993 || Catalina Station || C. W. Hergenrother || — || align=right | 7.5 km || 
|-id=708 bgcolor=#fefefe
| 7708 Fennimore ||  ||  || April 11, 1994 || Kushiro || S. Ueda, H. Kaneda || NYS || align=right | 3.9 km || 
|-id=709 bgcolor=#fefefe
| 7709 ||  || — || September 8, 1994 || Nachi-Katsuura || Y. Shimizu, T. Urata || FLO || align=right | 3.8 km || 
|-id=710 bgcolor=#d6d6d6
| 7710 Ishibashi ||  ||  || November 30, 1994 || Oizumi || T. Kobayashi || 7:4 || align=right | 17 km || 
|-id=711 bgcolor=#d6d6d6
| 7711 Říp || 1994 XF ||  || December 2, 1994 || Kleť || Z. Moravec || — || align=right | 17 km || 
|-id=712 bgcolor=#E9E9E9
| 7712 ||  || — || October 12, 1995 || Nachi-Katsuura || Y. Shimizu, T. Urata || — || align=right | 4.4 km || 
|-id=713 bgcolor=#fefefe
| 7713 Tsutomu || 1995 YE ||  || December 17, 1995 || Oizumi || T. Kobayashi || NYS || align=right | 3.1 km || 
|-id=714 bgcolor=#fefefe
| 7714 Briccialdi ||  ||  || February 9, 1996 || Stroncone || Santa Lucia Obs. || — || align=right | 2.9 km || 
|-id=715 bgcolor=#E9E9E9
| 7715 Leonidarosino ||  ||  || February 14, 1996 || Cima Ekar || U. Munari, M. Tombelli || MAR || align=right | 6.6 km || 
|-id=716 bgcolor=#fefefe
| 7716 Ube ||  ||  || February 22, 1996 || Kuma Kogen || A. Nakamura || V || align=right | 3.6 km || 
|-id=717 bgcolor=#fefefe
| 7717 Tabeisshi ||  ||  || January 7, 1997 || Oizumi || T. Kobayashi || — || align=right | 4.0 km || 
|-id=718 bgcolor=#d6d6d6
| 7718 Desnoux ||  ||  || March 10, 1997 || Ramonville || C. Buil || — || align=right | 14 km || 
|-id=719 bgcolor=#d6d6d6
| 7719 ||  || — || April 7, 1997 || Socorro || LINEAR || K-2 || align=right | 4.7 km || 
|-id=720 bgcolor=#d6d6d6
| 7720 Lepaute || 4559 P-L ||  || September 26, 1960 || Palomar || PLS || THM || align=right | 5.9 km || 
|-id=721 bgcolor=#E9E9E9
| 7721 Andrillat || 6612 P-L ||  || September 24, 1960 || Palomar || PLS || — || align=right | 5.2 km || 
|-id=722 bgcolor=#fefefe
| 7722 Firneis || 2240 T-2 ||  || September 29, 1973 || Palomar || PLS || V || align=right | 3.3 km || 
|-id=723 bgcolor=#FA8072
| 7723 Lugger || 1952 QW ||  || August 28, 1952 || Brooklyn || Indiana University || — || align=right | 3.4 km || 
|-id=724 bgcolor=#fefefe
| 7724 Moroso || 1970 OB ||  || July 24, 1970 || El Leoncito || Félix Aguilar Obs. || — || align=right | 4.4 km || 
|-id=725 bgcolor=#fefefe
| 7725 Selʹvinskij ||  ||  || September 11, 1972 || Nauchnij || N. S. Chernykh || — || align=right | 9.9 km || 
|-id=726 bgcolor=#fefefe
| 7726 Olegbykov ||  ||  || August 27, 1974 || Nauchnij || L. I. Chernykh || FLO || align=right | 3.5 km || 
|-id=727 bgcolor=#fefefe
| 7727 Chepurova ||  ||  || March 8, 1975 || Nauchnij || N. S. Chernykh || — || align=right | 9.2 km || 
|-id=728 bgcolor=#E9E9E9
| 7728 Giblin ||  ||  || January 12, 1977 || Palomar || E. Bowell || AGN || align=right | 6.5 km || 
|-id=729 bgcolor=#fefefe
| 7729 Golovanov ||  ||  || August 24, 1977 || Nauchnij || N. S. Chernykh || FLO || align=right | 6.8 km || 
|-id=730 bgcolor=#d6d6d6
| 7730 Sergerasimov ||  ||  || July 4, 1978 || Nauchnij || L. I. Chernykh || — || align=right | 15 km || 
|-id=731 bgcolor=#E9E9E9
| 7731 || 1978 UV || — || October 28, 1978 || Anderson Mesa || H. L. Giclas || — || align=right | 12 km || 
|-id=732 bgcolor=#d6d6d6
| 7732 Ralphpass ||  ||  || November 7, 1978 || Palomar || E. F. Helin, S. J. Bus || — || align=right | 7.8 km || 
|-id=733 bgcolor=#fefefe
| 7733 Segarpassi ||  ||  || June 25, 1979 || Siding Spring || E. F. Helin, S. J. Bus || — || align=right | 1.8 km || 
|-id=734 bgcolor=#fefefe
| 7734 Kaltenegger ||  ||  || June 25, 1979 || Siding Spring || E. F. Helin, S. J. Bus || — || align=right | 3.6 km || 
|-id=735 bgcolor=#E9E9E9
| 7735 Scorzelli ||  ||  || October 31, 1980 || Palomar || S. J. Bus || GEF || align=right | 6.7 km || 
|-id=736 bgcolor=#E9E9E9
| 7736 Nizhnij Novgorod ||  ||  || September 8, 1981 || Nauchnij || L. V. Zhuravleva || EUN || align=right | 7.7 km || 
|-id=737 bgcolor=#fefefe
| 7737 Sirrah || 1981 VU ||  || November 5, 1981 || Anderson Mesa || E. Bowell || NYS || align=right | 3.0 km || 
|-id=738 bgcolor=#fefefe
| 7738 Heyman ||  ||  || November 24, 1981 || Harvard Observatory || Oak Ridge Observatory || FLO || align=right | 3.9 km || 
|-id=739 bgcolor=#fefefe
| 7739 Čech || 1982 CE ||  || February 14, 1982 || Kleť || L. Brožek || — || align=right | 4.2 km || 
|-id=740 bgcolor=#fefefe
| 7740 Petit ||  ||  || September 6, 1983 || Anderson Mesa || E. Bowell || V || align=right | 5.1 km || 
|-id=741 bgcolor=#fefefe
| 7741 Fedoseev ||  ||  || September 1, 1983 || Nauchnij || L. G. Karachkina || — || align=right | 5.5 km || 
|-id=742 bgcolor=#E9E9E9
| 7742 Altamira || 1985 US ||  || October 20, 1985 || Kleť || A. Mrkos || HEN || align=right | 6.5 km || 
|-id=743 bgcolor=#fefefe
| 7743 || 1986 JA || — || May 2, 1986 || Brorfelde || Copenhagen Obs. || slow || align=right | 8.8 km || 
|-id=744 bgcolor=#E9E9E9
| 7744 ||  || — || August 26, 1986 || La Silla || H. Debehogne || — || align=right | 5.5 km || 
|-id=745 bgcolor=#E9E9E9
| 7745 ||  || — || February 22, 1987 || La Silla || H. Debehogne || DOR || align=right | 13 km || 
|-id=746 bgcolor=#d6d6d6
| 7746 ||  || — || September 13, 1987 || La Silla || H. Debehogne || THM || align=right | 19 km || 
|-id=747 bgcolor=#FA8072
| 7747 Michałowski || 1987 SO ||  || September 19, 1987 || Anderson Mesa || E. Bowell || — || align=right | 4.6 km || 
|-id=748 bgcolor=#fefefe
| 7748 || 1987 TA || — || October 12, 1987 || Ojima || T. Niijima, T. Urata || — || align=right | 4.1 km || 
|-id=749 bgcolor=#E9E9E9
| 7749 Jackschmitt || 1988 JP ||  || May 12, 1988 || Palomar || C. S. Shoemaker, E. M. Shoemaker || — || align=right | 8.0 km || 
|-id=750 bgcolor=#E9E9E9
| 7750 McEwen ||  ||  || August 18, 1988 || Palomar || C. S. Shoemaker, E. M. Shoemaker || — || align=right | 14 km || 
|-id=751 bgcolor=#fefefe
| 7751 || 1988 UA || — || October 16, 1988 || Kushiro || S. Ueda, H. Kaneda || NYS || align=right | 4.2 km || 
|-id=752 bgcolor=#fefefe
| 7752 Otauchunokai || 1988 US ||  || October 31, 1988 || Ojima || T. Niijima, K. Kanai || FLO || align=right | 5.4 km || 
|-id=753 bgcolor=#FFC2E0
| 7753 || 1988 XB || — || December 5, 1988 || Gekko || Y. Oshima || APO +1kmPHA || align=right data-sort-value="0.91" | 910 m || 
|-id=754 bgcolor=#d6d6d6
| 7754 Gopalan ||  ||  || October 2, 1989 || Cerro Tololo || S. J. Bus || KOR || align=right | 8.6 km || 
|-id=755 bgcolor=#d6d6d6
| 7755 Haute-Provence ||  ||  || December 28, 1989 || Haute-Provence || E. W. Elst || THM || align=right | 18 km || 
|-id=756 bgcolor=#d6d6d6
| 7756 Scientia ||  ||  || March 27, 1990 || Palomar || C. S. Shoemaker, E. M. Shoemaker || — || align=right | 16 km || 
|-id=757 bgcolor=#fefefe
| 7757 Kameya || 1990 KO ||  || May 22, 1990 || Palomar || E. F. Helin || PHO || align=right | 6.0 km || 
|-id=758 bgcolor=#fefefe
| 7758 Poulanderson || 1990 KT ||  || May 21, 1990 || Palomar || E. F. Helin || — || align=right | 4.1 km || 
|-id=759 bgcolor=#fefefe
| 7759 ||  || — || August 22, 1990 || Palomar || H. E. Holt || EUT || align=right | 5.0 km || 
|-id=760 bgcolor=#fefefe
| 7760 ||  || — || September 14, 1990 || Palomar || H. E. Holt || MAS || align=right | 4.9 km || 
|-id=761 bgcolor=#fefefe
| 7761 || 1990 SL || — || September 20, 1990 || Siding Spring || R. H. McNaught || — || align=right | 4.9 km || 
|-id=762 bgcolor=#d6d6d6
| 7762 ||  || — || September 18, 1990 || Palomar || H. E. Holt || KOR || align=right | 8.5 km || 
|-id=763 bgcolor=#E9E9E9
| 7763 Crabeels ||  ||  || October 16, 1990 || La Silla || E. W. Elst || — || align=right | 7.8 km || 
|-id=764 bgcolor=#E9E9E9
| 7764 || 1991 AB || — || January 7, 1991 || Karasuyama || S. Inoda, T. Urata || ADE || align=right | 14 km || 
|-id=765 bgcolor=#E9E9E9
| 7765 || 1991 AD || — || January 8, 1991 || Yatsugatake || Y. Kushida, O. Muramatsu || — || align=right | 7.7 km || 
|-id=766 bgcolor=#d6d6d6
| 7766 Jododaira ||  ||  || January 23, 1991 || Kitami || K. Endate, K. Watanabe || — || align=right | 15 km || 
|-id=767 bgcolor=#fefefe
| 7767 Tomatic ||  ||  || September 13, 1991 || Tautenburg Observatory || L. D. Schmadel, F. Börngen || V || align=right | 3.4 km || 
|-id=768 bgcolor=#fefefe
| 7768 ||  || — || September 16, 1991 || Palomar || H. E. Holt || — || align=right | 4.8 km || 
|-id=769 bgcolor=#fefefe
| 7769 Okuni ||  ||  || November 4, 1991 || Kiyosato || S. Otomo || V || align=right | 5.9 km || 
|-id=770 bgcolor=#d6d6d6
| 7770 Siljan ||  ||  || March 2, 1992 || La Silla || UESAC || KOR || align=right | 10 km || 
|-id=771 bgcolor=#E9E9E9
| 7771 Tvären ||  ||  || March 2, 1992 || La Silla || UESAC || — || align=right | 6.2 km || 
|-id=772 bgcolor=#d6d6d6
| 7772 ||  || — || March 1, 1992 || La Silla || UESAC || — || align=right | 6.8 km || 
|-id=773 bgcolor=#E9E9E9
| 7773 Kyokuchiken || 1992 FS ||  || March 23, 1992 || Kitami || K. Endate, K. Watanabe || — || align=right | 8.1 km || 
|-id=774 bgcolor=#fefefe
| 7774 ||  || — || October 19, 1992 || Kitami || K. Endate, K. Watanabe || — || align=right | 4.1 km || 
|-id=775 bgcolor=#E9E9E9
| 7775 Taiko || 1992 XD ||  || December 4, 1992 || Yatsugatake || Y. Kushida, O. Muramatsu || — || align=right | 8.3 km || 
|-id=776 bgcolor=#fefefe
| 7776 Takeishi || 1993 BF ||  || January 20, 1993 || Oohira || T. Urata || — || align=right | 6.2 km || 
|-id=777 bgcolor=#fefefe
| 7777 Consadole ||  ||  || February 15, 1993 || Kushiro || S. Ueda, H. Kaneda || FLO || align=right | 3.4 km || 
|-id=778 bgcolor=#FA8072
| 7778 Markrobinson ||  ||  || April 17, 1993 || Palomar || C. S. Shoemaker, E. M. Shoemaker || — || align=right | 6.5 km || 
|-id=779 bgcolor=#fefefe
| 7779 Susanring || 1993 KL ||  || May 19, 1993 || Palomar || J. B. Child || PHO || align=right | 4.7 km || 
|-id=780 bgcolor=#E9E9E9
| 7780 Maren || 1993 NJ ||  || July 15, 1993 || Palomar || E. F. Helin, J. B. Child || — || align=right | 5.7 km || 
|-id=781 bgcolor=#fefefe
| 7781 Townsend || 1993 QT ||  || August 19, 1993 || Palomar || E. F. Helin || H || align=right | 2.7 km || 
|-id=782 bgcolor=#d6d6d6
| 7782 Mony || 1994 CY ||  || February 7, 1994 || Stroncone || Santa Lucia Obs. || — || align=right | 11 km || 
|-id=783 bgcolor=#fefefe
| 7783 || 1994 JD || — || May 4, 1994 || Catalina Station || T. B. Spahr || H || align=right | 2.2 km || 
|-id=784 bgcolor=#fefefe
| 7784 Watterson || 1994 PL ||  || August 5, 1994 || Catalina Station || T. B. Spahr || PHO || align=right | 5.6 km || 
|-id=785 bgcolor=#fefefe
| 7785 || 1994 QW || — || August 29, 1994 || Nachi-Katsuura || Y. Shimizu, T. Urata || — || align=right | 4.4 km || 
|-id=786 bgcolor=#E9E9E9
| 7786 ||  || — || October 14, 1994 || Nachi-Katsuura || Y. Shimizu, T. Urata || — || align=right | 4.1 km || 
|-id=787 bgcolor=#fefefe
| 7787 Annalaura || 1994 WW ||  || November 23, 1994 || San Marcello || L. Tesi, A. Boattini || — || align=right | 2.6 km || 
|-id=788 bgcolor=#d6d6d6
| 7788 Tsukuba || 1994 XS ||  || December 5, 1994 || Kuma Kogen || A. Nakamura || — || align=right | 9.7 km || 
|-id=789 bgcolor=#fefefe
| 7789 Kwiatkowski ||  ||  || December 2, 1994 || Palomar || E. Bowell || FLO || align=right | 3.8 km || 
|-id=790 bgcolor=#d6d6d6
| 7790 Miselli ||  ||  || February 28, 1995 || Stroncone || Santa Lucia Obs. || — || align=right | 7.6 km || 
|-id=791 bgcolor=#d6d6d6
| 7791 Ebicykl || 1995 EB ||  || March 1, 1995 || Kleť || M. Tichý || — || align=right | 14 km || 
|-id=792 bgcolor=#fefefe
| 7792 ||  || — || November 18, 1995 || Nachi-Katsuura || Y. Shimizu, T. Urata || moon || align=right | 7.4 km || 
|-id=793 bgcolor=#d6d6d6
| 7793 ||  || — || December 27, 1995 || Haleakalā || NEAT || THM || align=right | 12 km || 
|-id=794 bgcolor=#fefefe
| 7794 Sanvito ||  ||  || January 15, 1996 || Cima Ekar || U. Munari, M. Tombelli || V || align=right | 4.6 km || 
|-id=795 bgcolor=#fefefe
| 7795 ||  || — || January 14, 1996 || Xinglong || SCAP || V || align=right | 2.2 km || 
|-id=796 bgcolor=#E9E9E9
| 7796 Járacimrman || 1996 BG ||  || January 16, 1996 || Kleť || Z. Moravec || ADE || align=right | 11 km || 
|-id=797 bgcolor=#d6d6d6
| 7797 Morita ||  ||  || January 26, 1996 || Oizumi || T. Kobayashi || — || align=right | 13 km || 
|-id=798 bgcolor=#fefefe
| 7798 || 1996 CL || — || February 1, 1996 || Xinglong || SCAP || — || align=right | 5.0 km || 
|-id=799 bgcolor=#fefefe
| 7799 Martinšolc ||  ||  || February 24, 1996 || Kleť || Kleť Obs. || — || align=right | 4.7 km || 
|-id=800 bgcolor=#fefefe
| 7800 Zhongkeyuan ||  ||  || March 11, 1996 || Xinglong || SCAP || — || align=right | 3.5 km || 
|}

7801–7900 

|-bgcolor=#E9E9E9
| 7801 Goretti ||  ||  || April 12, 1996 || San Marcello || L. Tesi, A. Boattini || — || align=right | 6.9 km || 
|-id=802 bgcolor=#fefefe
| 7802 Takiguchi ||  ||  || December 2, 1996 || Ōizumi || T. Kobayashi || NYS || align=right | 9.3 km || 
|-id=803 bgcolor=#E9E9E9
| 7803 Adachi ||  ||  || March 4, 1997 || Ōizumi || T. Kobayashi || AGN || align=right | 6.4 km || 
|-id=804 bgcolor=#fefefe
| 7804 Boesgaard || 3083 P-L ||  || September 24, 1960 || Palomar || PLS || — || align=right | 5.4 km || 
|-id=805 bgcolor=#fefefe
| 7805 Moons || 7610 P-L ||  || October 17, 1960 || Palomar || PLS || — || align=right | 3.4 km || 
|-id=806 bgcolor=#fefefe
| 7806 Umasslowell || 1971 UM ||  || October 26, 1971 || Hamburg-Bergedorf || L. Kohoutek || NYS || align=right | 3.9 km || 
|-id=807 bgcolor=#d6d6d6
| 7807 Grier ||  ||  || September 30, 1975 || Palomar || S. J. Bus || — || align=right | 14 km || 
|-id=808 bgcolor=#E9E9E9
| 7808 Bagould ||  ||  || April 5, 1976 || El Leoncito || M. R. Cesco || RAF || align=right | 8.1 km || 
|-id=809 bgcolor=#fefefe
| 7809 Marcialangton ||  ||  || June 25, 1979 || Siding Spring || E. F. Helin, S. J. Bus || — || align=right | 4.3 km || 
|-id=810 bgcolor=#fefefe
| 7810 || 1981 DE || — || February 26, 1981 || La Silla || H. Debehogne, G. DeSanctis || V || align=right | 4.5 km || 
|-id=811 bgcolor=#E9E9E9
| 7811 Zhaojiuzhang ||  ||  || February 23, 1982 || Xinglong || Purple Mountain Obs. || EUN || align=right | 7.3 km || 
|-id=812 bgcolor=#E9E9E9
| 7812 Billward || 1984 UT ||  || October 26, 1984 || Anderson Mesa || E. Bowell || — || align=right | 17 km || 
|-id=813 bgcolor=#E9E9E9
| 7813 Anderserikson ||  ||  || October 16, 1985 || Kvistaberg || C.-I. Lagerkvist || — || align=right | 6.5 km || 
|-id=814 bgcolor=#E9E9E9
| 7814 ||  || — || February 13, 1986 || La Silla || H. Debehogne || — || align=right | 19 km || 
|-id=815 bgcolor=#C2FFFF
| 7815 Dolon || 1987 QN ||  || August 21, 1987 || La Silla || E. W. Elst || L5 || align=right | 43 km || 
|-id=816 bgcolor=#FA8072
| 7816 Hanoi || 1987 YA ||  || December 18, 1987 || Ayashi Station || M. Koishikawa || — || align=right | 2.9 km || 
|-id=817 bgcolor=#E9E9E9
| 7817 Zibiturtle ||  ||  || September 14, 1988 || Cerro Tololo || S. J. Bus || AST || align=right | 12 km || 
|-id=818 bgcolor=#FA8072
| 7818 Muirhead || 1990 QO ||  || August 19, 1990 || Palomar || E. F. Helin || — || align=right | 3.9 km || 
|-id=819 bgcolor=#E9E9E9
| 7819 ||  || — || September 14, 1990 || Palomar || H. E. Holt || — || align=right | 4.9 km || 
|-id=820 bgcolor=#fefefe
| 7820 Ianlyon ||  ||  || October 14, 1990 || Kleť || A. Mrkos || NYS || align=right | 3.3 km || 
|-id=821 bgcolor=#d6d6d6
| 7821 || 1991 AC || — || January 8, 1991 || Yatsugatake || Y. Kushida, O. Muramatsu || KOR || align=right | 6.3 km || 
|-id=822 bgcolor=#FFC2E0
| 7822 || 1991 CS || — || February 13, 1991 || Siding Spring || R. H. McNaught || APO +1kmPHA || align=right | 1.6 km || 
|-id=823 bgcolor=#fefefe
| 7823 ||  || — || August 7, 1991 || Palomar || H. E. Holt || — || align=right | 2.6 km || 
|-id=824 bgcolor=#fefefe
| 7824 Lynch ||  ||  || September 7, 1991 || Palomar || E. F. Helin || — || align=right | 4.9 km || 
|-id=825 bgcolor=#fefefe
| 7825 ||  || — || October 10, 1991 || Palomar || J. Alu || — || align=right | 4.9 km || 
|-id=826 bgcolor=#fefefe
| 7826 Kinugasa || 1991 VO ||  || November 2, 1991 || Kitami || A. Takahashi, K. Watanabe || V || align=right | 3.4 km || 
|-id=827 bgcolor=#d6d6d6
| 7827 ||  || — || August 22, 1992 || Palomar || H. E. Holt || — || align=right | 8.7 km || 
|-id=828 bgcolor=#d6d6d6
| 7828 Noriyositosi ||  ||  || September 28, 1992 || Kitami || M. Yanai, K. Watanabe || — || align=right | 8.2 km || 
|-id=829 bgcolor=#fefefe
| 7829 Jaroff ||  ||  || November 21, 1992 || Palomar || E. F. Helin || H || align=right | 2.7 km || 
|-id=830 bgcolor=#fefefe
| 7830 Akihikotago ||  ||  || February 24, 1993 || Yatsugatake || Y. Kushida, O. Muramatsu || NYS || align=right | 3.8 km || 
|-id=831 bgcolor=#fefefe
| 7831 François-Xavier || 1993 FQ ||  || March 21, 1993 || Palomar || E. F. Helin || — || align=right | 5.2 km || 
|-id=832 bgcolor=#fefefe
| 7832 ||  || — || March 21, 1993 || La Silla || UESAC || FLO || align=right | 3.4 km || 
|-id=833 bgcolor=#fefefe
| 7833 Nilstamm ||  ||  || March 19, 1993 || La Silla || UESAC || — || align=right | 5.2 km || 
|-id=834 bgcolor=#E9E9E9
| 7834 || 1993 JL || — || May 14, 1993 || Kushiro || S. Ueda, H. Kaneda || EUN || align=right | 11 km || 
|-id=835 bgcolor=#E9E9E9
| 7835 Myroncope || 1993 MC ||  || June 16, 1993 || Catalina Station || T. B. Spahr || MIT || align=right | 11 km || 
|-id=836 bgcolor=#d6d6d6
| 7836 || 1993 TG || — || October 9, 1993 || Uenohara || N. Kawasato || — || align=right | 11 km || 
|-id=837 bgcolor=#E9E9E9
| 7837 Mutsumi || 1993 TX ||  || October 11, 1993 || Yatsuka || H. Abe, S. Miyasaka || — || align=right | 11 km || 
|-id=838 bgcolor=#d6d6d6
| 7838 Feliceierman || 1993 WA ||  || November 16, 1993 || Farra d'Isonzo || Farra d'Isonzo || ALA || align=right | 15 km || 
|-id=839 bgcolor=#FFC2E0
| 7839 || 1994 ND || — || July 3, 1994 || Siding Spring || R. H. McNaught || AMO +1km || align=right data-sort-value="0.78" | 780 m || 
|-id=840 bgcolor=#fefefe
| 7840 Hendrika ||  ||  || October 5, 1994 || NRC-DAO || G. C. L. Aikman || — || align=right | 2.5 km || 
|-id=841 bgcolor=#E9E9E9
| 7841 ||  || — || October 31, 1994 || Nachi-Katsuura || Y. Shimizu, T. Urata || — || align=right | 8.9 km || 
|-id=842 bgcolor=#fefefe
| 7842 Ishitsuka || 1994 XQ ||  || December 1, 1994 || Kitami || K. Endate, K. Watanabe || — || align=right | 3.7 km || 
|-id=843 bgcolor=#E9E9E9
| 7843 ||  || — || December 22, 1994 || Kushiro || S. Ueda, H. Kaneda || — || align=right | 13 km || 
|-id=844 bgcolor=#E9E9E9
| 7844 Horikawa ||  ||  || December 21, 1995 || Ōizumi || T. Kobayashi || — || align=right | 2.8 km || 
|-id=845 bgcolor=#d6d6d6
| 7845 Mckim || 1996 AC ||  || January 1, 1996 || Ōizumi || T. Kobayashi || THB || align=right | 13 km || 
|-id=846 bgcolor=#fefefe
| 7846 Setvák || 1996 BJ ||  || January 16, 1996 || Kleť || M. Tichý || — || align=right | 3.0 km || 
|-id=847 bgcolor=#d6d6d6
| 7847 Mattiaorsi ||  ||  || February 14, 1996 || Asiago || U. Munari, M. Tombelli || HYG || align=right | 9.8 km || 
|-id=848 bgcolor=#E9E9E9
| 7848 Bernasconi ||  ||  || February 22, 1996 || Sormano || M. Cavagna, A. Testa || — || align=right | 4.2 km || 
|-id=849 bgcolor=#E9E9E9
| 7849 Janjosefrič || 1996 HR ||  || April 18, 1996 || Ondřejov || P. Pravec, L. Kotková || NEM || align=right | 8.4 km || 
|-id=850 bgcolor=#fefefe
| 7850 Buenos Aires || 1996 LH ||  || June 10, 1996 || Mount Hopkins || L. Macri || — || align=right | 3.2 km || 
|-id=851 bgcolor=#fefefe
| 7851 Azumino ||  ||  || December 29, 1996 || Chichibu || N. Satō || FLO || align=right | 5.0 km || 
|-id=852 bgcolor=#fefefe
| 7852 Itsukushima || 7604 P-L ||  || October 17, 1960 || Palomar || PLS || — || align=right | 5.5 km || 
|-id=853 bgcolor=#d6d6d6
| 7853 Confucius || 2086 T-2 ||  || September 29, 1973 || Palomar || PLS || — || align=right | 13 km || 
|-id=854 bgcolor=#fefefe
| 7854 Laotse || 1076 T-3 ||  || October 17, 1977 || Palomar || PLS || — || align=right | 3.2 km || 
|-id=855 bgcolor=#E9E9E9
| 7855 Tagore || 4092 T-3 ||  || October 16, 1977 || Palomar || PLS || EUN || align=right | 5.7 km || 
|-id=856 bgcolor=#d6d6d6
| 7856 Viktorbykov ||  ||  || November 1, 1975 || Nauchnij || T. M. Smirnova || HYG || align=right | 11 km || 
|-id=857 bgcolor=#d6d6d6
| 7857 Lagerros ||  ||  || August 22, 1978 || Mount Stromlo || C.-I. Lagerkvist || — || align=right | 11 km || 
|-id=858 bgcolor=#fefefe
| 7858 Bolotov ||  ||  || September 26, 1978 || Nauchnij || L. V. Zhuravleva || — || align=right | 5.0 km || 
|-id=859 bgcolor=#E9E9E9
| 7859 Lhasa || 1979 US ||  || October 19, 1979 || Kleť || A. Mrkos || — || align=right | 16 km || 
|-id=860 bgcolor=#fefefe
| 7860 Zahnle || 1980 PF ||  || August 6, 1980 || Anderson Mesa || E. Bowell || — || align=right | 3.4 km || 
|-id=861 bgcolor=#fefefe
| 7861 Messenger ||  ||  || March 2, 1981 || Siding Spring || S. J. Bus || NYS || align=right | 2.8 km || 
|-id=862 bgcolor=#d6d6d6
| 7862 Keikonakamura ||  ||  || March 2, 1981 || Siding Spring || S. J. Bus || KOR || align=right | 5.0 km || 
|-id=863 bgcolor=#d6d6d6
| 7863 Turnbull || 1981 VK ||  || November 2, 1981 || Anderson Mesa || B. A. Skiff || THM || align=right | 12 km || 
|-id=864 bgcolor=#E9E9E9
| 7864 Borucki || 1982 EE ||  || March 14, 1982 || Kleť || A. Mrkos || — || align=right | 15 km || 
|-id=865 bgcolor=#fefefe
| 7865 Françoisgros ||  ||  || March 21, 1982 || La Silla || H. Debehogne || — || align=right | 4.5 km || 
|-id=866 bgcolor=#fefefe
| 7866 Sicoli || 1982 TK ||  || October 13, 1982 || Anderson Mesa || E. Bowell || NYS || align=right | 5.6 km || 
|-id=867 bgcolor=#fefefe
| 7867 Burian ||  ||  || September 20, 1984 || Kleť || A. Mrkos || FLO || align=right | 2.9 km || 
|-id=868 bgcolor=#E9E9E9
| 7868 Barker ||  ||  || October 26, 1984 || Anderson Mesa || E. Bowell || ADE || align=right | 15 km || 
|-id=869 bgcolor=#fefefe
| 7869 Pradun ||  ||  || September 2, 1987 || Nauchnij || L. I. Chernykh || FLO || align=right | 3.8 km || 
|-id=870 bgcolor=#FA8072
| 7870 ||  || — || October 25, 1987 || Brorfelde || P. Jensen || — || align=right | 3.9 km || 
|-id=871 bgcolor=#fefefe
| 7871 Tunder ||  ||  || September 22, 1990 || La Silla || E. W. Elst || — || align=right | 4.6 km || 
|-id=872 bgcolor=#fefefe
| 7872 || 1990 UC || — || October 18, 1990 || Oohira || T. Urata || — || align=right | 3.3 km || 
|-id=873 bgcolor=#E9E9E9
| 7873 Böll ||  ||  || January 15, 1991 || Tautenburg Observatory || F. Börngen || — || align=right | 6.2 km || 
|-id=874 bgcolor=#E9E9E9
| 7874 || 1991 BE || — || January 18, 1991 || Karasuyama || S. Inoda, T. Urata || — || align=right | 12 km || 
|-id=875 bgcolor=#E9E9E9
| 7875 ||  || — || March 7, 1991 || Kushiro || S. Ueda, H. Kaneda || — || align=right | 15 km || 
|-id=876 bgcolor=#fefefe
| 7876 ||  || — || November 11, 1991 || Kushiro || S. Ueda, H. Kaneda || — || align=right | 2.9 km || 
|-id=877 bgcolor=#E9E9E9
| 7877 ||  || — || January 10, 1992 || Uenohara || N. Kawasato || — || align=right | 3.0 km || 
|-id=878 bgcolor=#E9E9E9
| 7878 || 1992 DZ || — || February 27, 1992 || Uenohara || N. Kawasato || EUN || align=right | 5.9 km || 
|-id=879 bgcolor=#fefefe
| 7879 ||  || — || March 3, 1992 || La Silla || UESAC || — || align=right | 5.3 km || 
|-id=880 bgcolor=#E9E9E9
| 7880 ||  || — || July 19, 1992 || La Silla || H. Debehogne, Á. López-G. || HOF || align=right | 16 km || 
|-id=881 bgcolor=#d6d6d6
| 7881 Schieferdecker ||  ||  || September 2, 1992 || La Silla || E. W. Elst || KOR || align=right | 6.4 km || 
|-id=882 bgcolor=#fefefe
| 7882 ||  || — || March 17, 1993 || La Silla || UESAC || — || align=right | 2.8 km || 
|-id=883 bgcolor=#fefefe
| 7883 ||  || — || April 15, 1993 || Palomar || H. E. Holt || FLO || align=right | 3.8 km || 
|-id=884 bgcolor=#fefefe
| 7884 ||  || — || April 24, 1993 || La Silla || H. Debehogne || — || align=right | 3.3 km || 
|-id=885 bgcolor=#fefefe
| 7885 Levine ||  ||  || May 17, 1993 || Catalina Station || T. B. Spahr || PHO || align=right | 4.6 km || 
|-id=886 bgcolor=#fefefe
| 7886 Redman || 1993 PE ||  || August 12, 1993 || Climenhaga || D. D. Balam || — || align=right | 4.4 km || 
|-id=887 bgcolor=#E9E9E9
| 7887 Bratfest ||  ||  || September 18, 1993 || Catalina Station || C. W. Hergenrother || MAR || align=right | 11 km || 
|-id=888 bgcolor=#FFC2E0
| 7888 || 1993 UC || — || October 20, 1993 || Siding Spring || R. H. McNaught || APO +1kmmoon || align=right | 2.3 km || 
|-id=889 bgcolor=#FFC2E0
| 7889 || 1994 LX || — || June 15, 1994 || Kitt Peak || Spacewatch || APO +1km || align=right | 1.7 km || 
|-id=890 bgcolor=#fefefe
| 7890 Yasuofukui ||  ||  || October 2, 1994 || Kitami || K. Endate, K. Watanabe || — || align=right | 2.1 km || 
|-id=891 bgcolor=#fefefe
| 7891 Fuchie ||  ||  || November 11, 1994 || Nyukasa || M. Hirasawa, S. Suzuki || — || align=right | 5.5 km || 
|-id=892 bgcolor=#d6d6d6
| 7892 Musamurahigashi ||  ||  || November 27, 1994 || Nyukasa || M. Hirasawa, S. Suzuki || THM || align=right | 11 km || 
|-id=893 bgcolor=#fefefe
| 7893 || 1994 XY || — || December 2, 1994 || Nachi-Katsuura || Y. Shimizu, T. Urata || V || align=right | 2.6 km || 
|-id=894 bgcolor=#E9E9E9
| 7894 Rogers ||  ||  || December 6, 1994 || Ōizumi || T. Kobayashi || EUN || align=right | 5.6 km || 
|-id=895 bgcolor=#d6d6d6
| 7895 Kaseda ||  ||  || February 22, 1995 || Kashihara || F. Uto || — || align=right | 29 km || 
|-id=896 bgcolor=#d6d6d6
| 7896 Švejk || 1995 EC ||  || March 1, 1995 || Kleť || Z. Moravec || THM || align=right | 15 km || 
|-id=897 bgcolor=#d6d6d6
| 7897 Bohuška ||  ||  || March 12, 1995 || Ondřejov || L. Kotková || — || align=right | 8.5 km || 
|-id=898 bgcolor=#fefefe
| 7898 Ohkuma ||  ||  || December 15, 1995 || Ōizumi || T. Kobayashi || FLOslow || align=right | 3.8 km || 
|-id=899 bgcolor=#fefefe
| 7899 Joya ||  ||  || January 30, 1996 || Ōizumi || T. Kobayashi || — || align=right | 3.9 km || 
|-id=900 bgcolor=#fefefe
| 7900 Portule ||  ||  || February 14, 1996 || Cima Ekar || U. Munari, M. Tombelli || FLO || align=right | 4.0 km || 
|}

7901–8000 

|-bgcolor=#E9E9E9
| 7901 Konnai || 1996 DP ||  || February 19, 1996 || Oizumi || T. Kobayashi || — || align=right | 3.7 km || 
|-id=902 bgcolor=#d6d6d6
| 7902 Hanff ||  ||  || April 18, 1996 || La Silla || E. W. Elst || KAR || align=right | 6.9 km || 
|-id=903 bgcolor=#d6d6d6
| 7903 Albinoni ||  ||  || April 20, 1996 || La Silla || E. W. Elst || — || align=right | 6.8 km || 
|-id=904 bgcolor=#E9E9E9
| 7904 Morrow ||  ||  || May 1, 1997 || Socorro || LINEAR || — || align=right | 4.3 km || 
|-id=905 bgcolor=#d6d6d6
| 7905 Juzoitami || 1997 OX ||  || July 24, 1997 || Kuma Kogen || A. Nakamura || — || align=right | 23 km || 
|-id=906 bgcolor=#d6d6d6
| 7906 Melanchton || 3081 P-L ||  || September 24, 1960 || Palomar || PLS || — || align=right | 9.5 km || 
|-id=907 bgcolor=#E9E9E9
| 7907 Erasmus || 4047 P-L ||  || September 24, 1960 || Palomar || PLS || — || align=right | 8.2 km || 
|-id=908 bgcolor=#fefefe
| 7908 Zwingli || 4192 T-1 ||  || March 26, 1971 || Palomar || PLS || — || align=right | 4.0 km || 
|-id=909 bgcolor=#d6d6d6
| 7909 Ziffer || 1975 SK ||  || September 30, 1975 || Palomar || S. J. Bus || THM || align=right | 11 km || 
|-id=910 bgcolor=#fefefe
| 7910 Aleksola ||  ||  || April 1, 1976 || Nauchnij || N. S. Chernykh || — || align=right | 5.5 km || 
|-id=911 bgcolor=#d6d6d6
| 7911 Carlpilcher ||  ||  || September 8, 1977 || Palomar || E. Bowell || — || align=right | 15 km || 
|-id=912 bgcolor=#fefefe
| 7912 Lapovok ||  ||  || August 8, 1978 || Nauchnij || N. S. Chernykh || — || align=right | 7.7 km || 
|-id=913 bgcolor=#d6d6d6
| 7913 Parfenov ||  ||  || October 9, 1978 || Nauchnij || L. V. Zhuravleva || KOR || align=right | 7.3 km || 
|-id=914 bgcolor=#fefefe
| 7914 ||  || — || October 27, 1978 || Palomar || C. M. Olmstead || — || align=right | 4.7 km || 
|-id=915 bgcolor=#fefefe
| 7915 Halbrook ||  ||  || June 25, 1979 || Siding Spring || E. F. Helin, S. J. Bus || — || align=right | 2.6 km || 
|-id=916 bgcolor=#fefefe
| 7916 Gigiproietti || 1981 EN ||  || March 1, 1981 || La Silla || H. Debehogne, G. DeSanctis || — || align=right | 3.6 km || 
|-id=917 bgcolor=#fefefe
| 7917 Hammergren ||  ||  || March 2, 1981 || Siding Spring || S. J. Bus || — || align=right | 3.2 km || 
|-id=918 bgcolor=#fefefe
| 7918 Berrilli ||  ||  || March 2, 1981 || Siding Spring || S. J. Bus || — || align=right | 3.2 km || 
|-id=919 bgcolor=#fefefe
| 7919 Prime ||  ||  || March 2, 1981 || Siding Spring || S. J. Bus || — || align=right | 3.7 km || 
|-id=920 bgcolor=#E9E9E9
| 7920 ||  || — || December 3, 1981 || Nanking || Purple Mountain Obs. || — || align=right | 9.6 km || 
|-id=921 bgcolor=#fefefe
| 7921 Huebner || 1982 RF ||  || September 15, 1982 || Anderson Mesa || E. Bowell || NYS || align=right | 5.6 km || 
|-id=922 bgcolor=#d6d6d6
| 7922 Violalaurenti ||  ||  || February 12, 1983 || La Silla || H. Debehogne, G. DeSanctis || — || align=right | 15 km || 
|-id=923 bgcolor=#d6d6d6
| 7923 Chyba || 1983 WJ ||  || November 28, 1983 || Anderson Mesa || E. Bowell || KOR || align=right | 6.0 km || 
|-id=924 bgcolor=#d6d6d6
| 7924 Simbirsk ||  ||  || August 6, 1986 || Nauchnij || N. S. Chernykh, L. I. Chernykh || THM || align=right | 13 km || 
|-id=925 bgcolor=#d6d6d6
| 7925 Shelus ||  ||  || September 6, 1986 || Anderson Mesa || E. Bowell || — || align=right | 11 km || 
|-id=926 bgcolor=#d6d6d6
| 7926 ||  || — || September 3, 1986 || La Silla || H. Debehogne || — || align=right | 13 km || 
|-id=927 bgcolor=#d6d6d6
| 7927 Jamiegilmour ||  ||  || November 29, 1986 || Kleť || A. Mrkos || — || align=right | 12 km || 
|-id=928 bgcolor=#d6d6d6
| 7928 Bijaoui ||  ||  || November 27, 1986 || Caussols || CERGA || — || align=right | 16 km || 
|-id=929 bgcolor=#fefefe
| 7929 ||  || — || September 16, 1987 || La Silla || H. Debehogne || — || align=right | 3.8 km || 
|-id=930 bgcolor=#fefefe
| 7930 || 1987 VD || — || November 15, 1987 || Kushiro || S. Ueda, H. Kaneda || — || align=right | 3.1 km || 
|-id=931 bgcolor=#fefefe
| 7931 Kristianpedersen ||  ||  || March 13, 1988 || Brorfelde || P. Jensen || NYS || align=right | 3.7 km || 
|-id=932 bgcolor=#fefefe
| 7932 Plimpton || 1989 GP ||  || April 7, 1989 || Palomar || E. F. Helin || NYS || align=right | 4.4 km || 
|-id=933 bgcolor=#fefefe
| 7933 Magritte ||  ||  || April 3, 1989 || La Silla || E. W. Elst || V || align=right | 3.0 km || 
|-id=934 bgcolor=#E9E9E9
| 7934 Sinatra ||  ||  || September 26, 1989 || La Silla || E. W. Elst || RAF || align=right | 3.4 km || 
|-id=935 bgcolor=#d6d6d6
| 7935 Beppefenoglio ||  ||  || March 1, 1990 || La Silla || H. Debehogne || THM || align=right | 13 km || 
|-id=936 bgcolor=#fefefe
| 7936 Mikemagee ||  ||  || July 30, 1990 || Palomar || H. E. Holt || — || align=right | 3.4 km || 
|-id=937 bgcolor=#E9E9E9
| 7937 ||  || — || August 22, 1990 || Palomar || H. E. Holt || — || align=right | 5.7 km || 
|-id=938 bgcolor=#fefefe
| 7938 ||  || — || September 17, 1990 || Palomar || H. E. Holt || FLO || align=right | 4.1 km || 
|-id=939 bgcolor=#fefefe
| 7939 Asphaug ||  ||  || January 14, 1991 || Palomar || E. F. Helin || NYS || align=right | 3.0 km || 
|-id=940 bgcolor=#E9E9E9
| 7940 Erichmeyer ||  ||  || March 13, 1991 || Harvard Observatory || Oak Ridge Observatory || — || align=right | 7.3 km || 
|-id=941 bgcolor=#d6d6d6
| 7941 ||  || — || July 12, 1991 || Palomar || H. E. Holt || — || align=right | 15 km || 
|-id=942 bgcolor=#d6d6d6
| 7942 ||  || — || July 18, 1991 || La Silla || H. Debehogne || — || align=right | 12 km || 
|-id=943 bgcolor=#d6d6d6
| 7943 ||  || — || August 5, 1991 || Palomar || H. E. Holt || THM || align=right | 11 km || 
|-id=944 bgcolor=#d6d6d6
| 7944 ||  || — || August 5, 1991 || Palomar || H. E. Holt || — || align=right | 12 km || 
|-id=945 bgcolor=#fefefe
| 7945 Kreisau ||  ||  || September 13, 1991 || Tautenburg Observatory || F. Börngen, L. D. Schmadel || FLO || align=right | 3.7 km || 
|-id=946 bgcolor=#fefefe
| 7946 ||  || — || September 13, 1991 || Palomar || H. E. Holt || V || align=right | 3.7 km || 
|-id=947 bgcolor=#fefefe
| 7947 Toland ||  ||  || January 30, 1992 || La Silla || E. W. Elst || — || align=right | 2.5 km || 
|-id=948 bgcolor=#fefefe
| 7948 Whitaker || 1992 HY ||  || April 24, 1992 || Kitt Peak || Spacewatch || — || align=right | 4.7 km || 
|-id=949 bgcolor=#d6d6d6
| 7949 || 1992 SU || — || September 23, 1992 || Palomar || E. F. Helin || — || align=right | 17 km || 
|-id=950 bgcolor=#d6d6d6
| 7950 Berezov ||  ||  || September 28, 1992 || Nauchnij || L. V. Zhuravleva || — || align=right | 24 km || 
|-id=951 bgcolor=#d6d6d6
| 7951 ||  || — || November 18, 1992 || Kushiro || S. Ueda, H. Kaneda || THM || align=right | 11 km || 
|-id=952 bgcolor=#d6d6d6
| 7952 || 1992 XB || — || December 3, 1992 || Yakiimo || A. Natori, T. Urata || — || align=right | 9.6 km || 
|-id=953 bgcolor=#fefefe
| 7953 Kawaguchi || 1993 KP ||  || May 20, 1993 || Kiyosato || S. Otomo || — || align=right | 4.8 km || 
|-id=954 bgcolor=#E9E9E9
| 7954 Kitao ||  ||  || September 19, 1993 || Kitami || K. Endate, K. Watanabe || EUN || align=right | 5.8 km || 
|-id=955 bgcolor=#E9E9E9
| 7955 Ogiwara || 1993 WE ||  || November 18, 1993 || Oohira || T. Urata || XIZ || align=right | 6.0 km || 
|-id=956 bgcolor=#d6d6d6
| 7956 Yaji || 1993 YH ||  || December 17, 1993 || Oizumi || T. Kobayashi || THM || align=right | 11 km || 
|-id=957 bgcolor=#E9E9E9
| 7957 Antonella || 1994 BT ||  || January 17, 1994 || Cima Ekar || A. Boattini, M. Tombelli || GEF || align=right | 5.1 km || 
|-id=958 bgcolor=#fefefe
| 7958 Leakey ||  ||  || June 5, 1994 || Palomar || C. S. Shoemaker, E. M. Shoemaker || Hmoon || align=right | 2.9 km || 
|-id=959 bgcolor=#fefefe
| 7959 Alysecherri || 1994 PK ||  || August 2, 1994 || Catalina Station || C. W. Hergenrother || H || align=right | 2.7 km || 
|-id=960 bgcolor=#fefefe
| 7960 Condorcet ||  ||  || August 10, 1994 || La Silla || E. W. Elst || — || align=right | 4.2 km || 
|-id=961 bgcolor=#fefefe
| 7961 Ercolepoli ||  ||  || October 10, 1994 || Colleverde || V. S. Casulli || FLO || align=right | 3.4 km || 
|-id=962 bgcolor=#fefefe
| 7962 ||  || — || November 28, 1994 || Kushiro || S. Ueda, H. Kaneda || — || align=right | 2.6 km || 
|-id=963 bgcolor=#E9E9E9
| 7963 Falcinelli || 1995 CA ||  || February 1, 1995 || Stroncone || Santa Lucia Obs. || EUN || align=right | 6.3 km || 
|-id=964 bgcolor=#E9E9E9
| 7964 ||  || — || February 23, 1995 || Nachi-Katsuura || Y. Shimizu, T. Urata || — || align=right | 8.0 km || 
|-id=965 bgcolor=#fefefe
| 7965 Katsuhiko ||  ||  || January 17, 1996 || Kitami || K. Endate, K. Watanabe || — || align=right | 21 km || 
|-id=966 bgcolor=#fefefe
| 7966 Richardbaum || 1996 DA ||  || February 18, 1996 || Oizumi || T. Kobayashi || NYS || align=right | 3.8 km || 
|-id=967 bgcolor=#fefefe
| 7967 Beny ||  ||  || February 28, 1996 || Kleť || Z. Moravec || — || align=right | 3.2 km || 
|-id=968 bgcolor=#d6d6d6
| 7968 Elst-Pizarro || 1996 N2 ||  || July 14, 1996 || La Silla || E. W. Elst, G. Pizarro || THM || align=right | 3.2 km || 
|-id=969 bgcolor=#d6d6d6
| 7969 ||  || — || September 5, 1997 || Nachi-Katsuura || Y. Shimizu, T. Urata || THM || align=right | 13 km || 
|-id=970 bgcolor=#E9E9E9
| 7970 Lichtenberg || 6065 P-L ||  || September 24, 1960 || Palomar || PLS || — || align=right | 6.2 km || 
|-id=971 bgcolor=#E9E9E9
| 7971 Meckbach || 9002 P-L ||  || October 17, 1960 || Palomar || PLS || — || align=right | 5.4 km || 
|-id=972 bgcolor=#d6d6d6
| 7972 Mariotti || 1174 T-1 ||  || March 25, 1971 || Palomar || PLS || THM || align=right | 9.5 km || 
|-id=973 bgcolor=#d6d6d6
| 7973 Koppeschaar || 1344 T-2 ||  || September 29, 1973 || Palomar || PLS || — || align=right | 3.6 km || 
|-id=974 bgcolor=#fefefe
| 7974 Vermeesch || 2218 T-2 ||  || September 29, 1973 || Palomar || PLS || — || align=right | 3.0 km || 
|-id=975 bgcolor=#d6d6d6
| 7975 || 1974 FD || — || March 22, 1974 || Cerro El Roble || C. Torres || EOS || align=right | 11 km || 
|-id=976 bgcolor=#fefefe
| 7976 Pinigin ||  ||  || August 21, 1977 || Nauchnij || N. S. Chernykh || — || align=right | 3.7 km || 
|-id=977 bgcolor=#FFC2E0
| 7977 ||  || — || August 21, 1977 || Siding Spring || R. H. McNaught || AMO +1km || align=right | 3.3 km || 
|-id=978 bgcolor=#fefefe
| 7978 Niknesterov ||  ||  || September 27, 1978 || Nauchnij || L. I. Chernykh || — || align=right | 2.8 km || 
|-id=979 bgcolor=#d6d6d6
| 7979 Pozharskij ||  ||  || September 26, 1978 || Nauchnij || L. V. Zhuravleva || — || align=right | 12 km || 
|-id=980 bgcolor=#E9E9E9
| 7980 Senkevich ||  ||  || October 3, 1978 || Nauchnij || N. S. Chernykh || — || align=right | 4.3 km || 
|-id=981 bgcolor=#d6d6d6
| 7981 Katieoakman ||  ||  || November 7, 1978 || Palomar || E. F. Helin, S. J. Bus || — || align=right | 5.7 km || 
|-id=982 bgcolor=#fefefe
| 7982 Timmartin ||  ||  || June 25, 1979 || Siding Spring || E. F. Helin, S. J. Bus || — || align=right | 3.0 km || 
|-id=983 bgcolor=#fefefe
| 7983 Festin || 1980 FY ||  || March 16, 1980 || La Silla || C.-I. Lagerkvist || — || align=right | 4.0 km || 
|-id=984 bgcolor=#E9E9E9
| 7984 Marius || 1980 SM ||  || September 29, 1980 || Kleť || Z. Vávrová || — || align=right | 10 km || 
|-id=985 bgcolor=#fefefe
| 7985 Nedelcu ||  ||  || March 1, 1981 || Siding Spring || S. J. Bus || — || align=right | 3.0 km || 
|-id=986 bgcolor=#fefefe
| 7986 Romania ||  ||  || March 1, 1981 || Siding Spring || S. J. Bus || — || align=right | 2.1 km || 
|-id=987 bgcolor=#E9E9E9
| 7987 Walshkevin ||  ||  || March 2, 1981 || Siding Spring || S. J. Bus || — || align=right | 9.1 km || 
|-id=988 bgcolor=#fefefe
| 7988 Pucacco ||  ||  || March 2, 1981 || Siding Spring || S. J. Bus || NYS || align=right | 2.3 km || 
|-id=989 bgcolor=#fefefe
| 7989 Pernadavide ||  ||  || March 2, 1981 || Siding Spring || S. J. Bus || MAS || align=right | 2.3 km || 
|-id=990 bgcolor=#d6d6d6
| 7990 ||  || — || September 26, 1981 || Anderson Mesa || N. G. Thomas || — || align=right | 8.7 km || 
|-id=991 bgcolor=#d6d6d6
| 7991 Kaguyahime ||  ||  || October 30, 1981 || Kiso || H. Kosai, K. Furukawa || THM || align=right | 14 km || 
|-id=992 bgcolor=#d6d6d6
| 7992 Yozan || 1981 WC ||  || November 28, 1981 || Tōkai || T. Furuta || — || align=right | 16 km || 
|-id=993 bgcolor=#d6d6d6
| 7993 Johnbridges ||  ||  || October 16, 1982 || Kleť || A. Mrkos || KOR || align=right | 8.5 km || 
|-id=994 bgcolor=#d6d6d6
| 7994 Bethellen ||  ||  || February 15, 1983 || Anderson Mesa || E. Bowell || THM || align=right | 17 km || 
|-id=995 bgcolor=#E9E9E9
| 7995 Khvorostovsky || 1983 PX ||  || August 4, 1983 || Nauchnij || L. G. Karachkina || — || align=right | 7.5 km || 
|-id=996 bgcolor=#d6d6d6
| 7996 Vedernikov ||  ||  || September 1, 1983 || Nauchnij || L. G. Karachkina || — || align=right | 8.7 km || 
|-id=997 bgcolor=#fefefe
| 7997 ||  || — || February 13, 1985 || La Silla || H. Debehogne || NYS || align=right | 3.7 km || 
|-id=998 bgcolor=#fefefe
| 7998 Gonczi || 1985 JK ||  || May 15, 1985 || Anderson Mesa || E. Bowell || FLO || align=right | 3.4 km || 
|-id=999 bgcolor=#d6d6d6
| 7999 Nesvorný ||  ||  || September 11, 1986 || Anderson Mesa || E. Bowell || — || align=right | 25 km || 
|-id=000 bgcolor=#d6d6d6
| 8000 Isaac Newton ||  ||  || September 5, 1986 || La Silla || H. Debehogne || EOS || align=right | 11 km || 
|}

References

External links 
 Discovery Circumstances: Numbered Minor Planets (5001)–(10000) (IAU Minor Planet Center)

0007